= LSE Law School =

London School of Economics Law School

Coordinates: 51.515351°N 0.118094°W

- Parent school: London School of Economics
- Established: 1919; 107 years ago
- School type: Public law school
- Dean: Andrew Murray
- Location: London, United Kingdom
- Website: www.lse.ac.uk/law

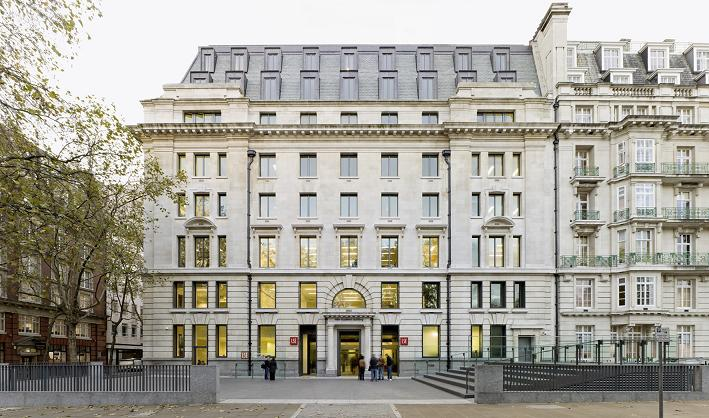
Cheng Kin Ku Building, seat of the LSE Law School.

LSE Law School is the law school of the London School of Economics.

The teaching of law at LSE dates back to the university's founding in 1895, although the Law School itself was formally established in 1919 with the appointment of H. C. Gutteridge as Professor of Law. It is one of the largest departments at LSE, with more than 60 academic staff. Since September 2025, Andrew Murray has held the office of the dean, succeeding David Kershaw.

== History ==
In 1895, the year in which LSE was established, commercial and industrial law were among the nine courses offered at the university. In 1906, LSE's law faculty became part of the intercollegiate faculty of law of the University of London, alongside the law schools of University College London and King's College London, which continued into the 1960s for undergraduate courses. Among those teaching law in the early days at LSE were Robert Wright, later appointed a law lord, A. V. Dicey, Vinerian Professor of English Law at Oxford, and L. F. L. Oppenheim.

In 1919, H. C. Gutteridge was appointed as the first full-time Professor of Law at the LSE Law School and Sir Ernest Cassel, was appointed subsequently as Professor of Industrial and Commercial law. Cassel led the expansion of the school from one full-time professor, five part-time lecturers and two other part-time teachers in 1924 to a full-time staff of ten, with four professors, two readers and four lecturers, in 1934, forming the largest law department of any University of London college.

In the 1930s the school was joined by German-Jewish jurists fleeing Nazi persecution, including Otto Kahn-Freund. David Hughes Parry held the professorship of English law from 1930 to 1959, and in 1937 Robert Chorley founded the Modern Law Review at the school.

== Facilities ==
LSE Law School is located on Lincoln's Inn Fields in the Cheng Kin Ku Building (abbreviated as CKK, formerly the New Academic Building, NAB), named in honour of LSE donor Vincent Cheng’s father.

== Academic profile ==
=== Teaching ===
LSE Law School offers undergraduate (LLB, BA Law and Anthropology), taught postgraduate (LLM, MSc Law and Finance, and Executive LLM), and research (PhD) degrees. It also offers a conjoint LLB/JD (Juris Doctor) degree with the Columbia Law School at Columbia University in the United States.

=== Research ===
LSE Law School has traditionally maintained close academic ties with the Modern Law Review and the London Review of International Law, both of which were founded at the school. The school hosts its annual Chorley Lecture, named in honour of Robert Chorley, 1st Baron Chorley.

=== Admissions ===
The LLB in Laws programme received 17 applications for each place in 2024.

=== Reputation and rankings ===
Rankings
National rankings
- Complete (2027): 3
- Guardian (2026): 1
- Times / Sunday Times (2026): 2

Global rankings
- ARWU (2026): 51–75
- QS (2027): 6
- THE (2026): 13

Nationally, the Complete University Guide 2026 ranked LSE 5th for law,The Guardian University Guide 2026 ranked LSE 1st for law, and The Times and Sunday Times Good University Guide 2026 ranked LSE 2nd for law. Internationally, LSE was ranked 13th in the world in 2025 by Times Higher Education, 6th in the world for law in the law and legal studies subject ranking of the QS World University Rankings 2025, and in the 51 to 75 range in the Shanghai Ranking Global Ranking of Academic Subjects for 2024.

== Notable people ==
=== Alumni ===
At least one prime minister or president of the countries of Barbados, Grenada, Guyana, Jamaica, Mauritius, Sierra Leone, Saint Lucia, Ghana, Peru, Jordan and Thailand has earned an LLB or LLM from the law school. Former president of Taiwan, Tsai Ing-wen, earned a PhD in law in 1984 Singapore's founding Prime Minister, Lee Kuan Yew, initially enrolled to read law at the school before transferring to Cambridge. Jane Yumiko Ittogi, the First Lady of Singapore, earned both her LLB and LLM from the LSE Law School. Whilst at LSE, she met Tharman Shanmugaratnam, the ninth President of Singapore, who is himself an LSE alumnus. Cherie Blair, a barrister and wife of British Prime Minister Tony Blair, earned an LLB in 1975. Former United States Supreme Court Justice, Anthony Kennedy, spent the final year of his degree at the school.

The school also educated Shami Chakrabarti, Eugenia Charles, John Compton, Jean Corston, Linda Dobbs, Audrey Eu, Tony Grabiner, Mia Mottley, P. J. Patterson, Mónica Feria Tinta and Veerasamy Ringadoo.

=== Staff ===
Among the staff of the school were three presidents of the International Court of Justice, Arnold McNair, Robert Jennings and Rosalyn Higgins. Hersch Lauterpacht became an ICJ judge. Derry Irvine, who lectured at LSE before being called to the bar, was appointed Lord Chancellor in 1997.

Other notable current and former professors at LSE Law School include Julia Black, Robert Chorley, Hugh Collins, Ross Cranston, Paul Davies, Neil Duxbury, Conor Gearty, John Griffith, Jim Gower, Christopher Greenwood, Jeremy Horder, Emily Jackson, Otto Kahn-Freund, David Kershaw, Nicola Lacey, Niamh Moloney, David Hughes Parry, Thomas Poole, Stanley Alexander de Smith, Sarah Worthington, Bill Wedderburn, Glanville Williams and Michael Zander.
