= Maleiha Malik =

British law professor

Professor Maleiha Malik
- Occupation: Professor of Law

Academic background
- Education: University of Oxford

Academic work
- Discipline: Anti-discrimination Law with focus on both the theory and practice; Jurisprudence & Legal Theory; European Law
- Sub-discipline: Anti-discrimination; Religion and Minority legal orders; Sexual and Cultural equality; Feminist theory in Cultural pluralism context;
- Institutions: King's College London
- Main interests: Anti-Muslim prejudice, discrimination of minorities
- Notable works: Anti-Muslim prejudice in the West, past and present; Discrimination law: theory and context; Religion and Minority Legal Orders
- Website: Prof. Maleiha Malik KCL

Maleiha Malik is a professor of law at King's College London (KCL), lecturing in jurisprudence and legal theory, discrimination law and European law; she is also an attorney, and a member of the Honourable Society of Gray's Inn.

== Education and research ==
Maleiha Malik studied law at the University of London and University of Oxford. Malik's research interest is anti-discrimination law, with focus on both the theory and practice. In addition of researching and writing on the subject, she has also written extensively on minority protection and feminist theory. Malik is the co-author of "Discrimination Law: Theory and Practice", published in 2008, and is the coordinator of the AHRC project on "Traditions in the Present", along with professor of modern history, dr. Jon Wilson, from the Department of History at King's College London, which explores the relevance of "tradition" in contemporary societies. As of recently, she researched the intersection between sexual and cultural equality, exploring feminist theory possible adjustments that could accommodate increasing cultural pluralism. In line with her main research interest, anti-discrimination law, she is also at the forefront of the campaigns against anti-Muslim prejudices in Britain and Europe.

Malik is a member of number of research organisations, peer review panels and committees/working groups. Malik is an editor of the Social & Legal Studies journal since 1995, and editorial board member since 1997. She is a member of the Liberty Council since 1995, the Arts and Humanities Research Council Peer Review Steering Committee since 2007, the Royal Society of Arts since 2008, and a member of Equality and Diversity Forum Academic Group since 2009. Her membership of peer review panels or committees include engagement at the Arts and Humanities Research Council since 2007, and acting as an editor at peer-review the Modern Law Review journal since 1995.

She started publishing her work in 1996, and has written more than 15 book chapters and over 28 publications.

== Published works ==
Published books, book chapters, articles and reviews in journals, and other:

- Regulating religious diversity in liberal societies - (1 Jan 2016) Negotiating Religion: Cross-Disciplinary Perspectives. Taylor and Francis, p. 245-259 - Chapter in book
- Religion and Minority Legal Orders - (December 2015) Religion, Secularism, and Constitutional Democracy. Cohen, J. L. & Laborde, C. (eds.). Columbia University Press - Chapter in book
- Magna Carta, rule of law and religious diversity - (May 2015) Magna Carta, Religion and the Rule of Law. Cambridge University Press, p. 248-264 - Chapter in book
- Minorities and Law: Past and Present - (1 Jan 2014) In : Current Legal Problems. 67, 1, p. 67-98 - Chapter in book
- Religion and Sexual Orientation: Conflict or Cohesion? - (2013) Religion in a Liberal State. D'Costa, G., Evans, M., Modood, T. & Rivers, J. (eds.). N/A ed. Cambridge: Cambridge University Press, Vol. N/A. p. 67-92 - Chapter in book
- Minority Legal Orders in the UK: Minorities, Pluralism and Law - (2012) London: British Academy - Book
- The 'other' citizens: religion in a multicultural Europe - (2012) Law, state and religion in the new Europe: debates and dilemmas. Zucca, L. & Ungureanu, C. (eds.). Cambridge: Cambridge University Press, p. 93-114 - Chapter in book
- Religious Freedom, Free Speech and Equality: Conflict or Cohesion? - (February 2011) In : Res Publica. 17, 1, p. 21-40 - Article in journal
- Anti-Muslim Prejudice: Past and Present - (2010) Abingdon: Routledge - Book
- Extreme Speech and Liberalism - (2010) Extreme Speech and Democracy. Hare, I. & Weinstein, J. (eds.). Oxford: Oxford University Press, p. 96-122 - Chapter in book
- Law's Meaning of Life: Philosophy, Religion, Darwin and the Legal Person - (2010) In : Modern Law Review. 73, 6, p. 1076-1078 - Review in journal
- Progressive Multiculturalism: Minority Women and Cultural Diversity - (2010) In : International Journal on Minority and Group Rights. 17, 3, p. 447-467 - Article in journal
- Anti-Muslim prejudice in the West, past and present: an introduction - (2009) In : Patterns of Prejudice. 43, 3-4, p. 207-212 - Editorial
- Law and Religion in Theoretical and Historical Context - (2009) In : Social and Legal Studies. 18, 2, p. 280-282 - Review in journal
- Engaging with Extremists - (March 2008) In : International Relations. 22, 1, p. 85-104 - Article in journal
- Complex Equality: Muslim Women and the Headscarf - (2008) In : Droit et Societe, Revue Internationale de Theorie du Droit et de Sociologie Juridique. 68, 1, p. 127-152 - Article in journal
- Discrimination law: theory and context (text and materials) - Bamforth, Malik & O'Cinneide (2008), 1st ed. ed. London: Sweet & Maxwell - Book
- Modernising Discrimination Law: Proposals for a Single Equality Act for Great Britain - (December 2007) In : International Journal of Discrimination and the Law. 9, 2, p. 73-94 - Article in journal
- Anti-Discrimination Law in Britain - (2007) Handbuch Gleichbehandlungsrecht. Rudolf, B. & Mahlmann, M. (eds.). Baden-Baden: Nomos, p. 135-166 - Chapter in book
- A Mirror for Liberalism: Europe's New Wars of Religion - (2006) Ein neuer Kampf der Religionen?: Staat, Recht und religiose Toleranz. Mahlmann, M. & Rottleuthner, H. (eds.). Berlin: Duncker & Humblot, p. 241-269 - Chapter in book
- The Branch on Which We Sit - (2006) Feminist Perspectives on Family Law. Diduick, A. (ed.). London: Taylor & Francis Ltd, p. 211-233 - Chapter in book
- Equality, Discrimination and Social Cohesion - (2005) Muslims in the UK: policies for engaged citizens . Choudhury, T. (ed.). New York: Open Society Institute, EU Monitoring and advocacy program, p. 46-99 - Chapter in book
- Justice - (2005) Fields of Faith : Theology and Religious Studies for the Twenty-first Century . Ford, D. F., Quash, B. & Soskice, J. M. (eds.). Cambridge University Press, p. 182-206 - Chapter in book
- Governing After the Human Rights Act - (2000) In : Modern Law Review. 63, PART 2, p. 281-293 - Article in journal
- Communal Goods as Human Rights - (1996) Understanding Human Rights. Gearty, C. & Tomkins, A. (eds.). London: Mansell, p. 138-170 - Chapter in book

== Prizes ==
2007: Fellowship awarded competitively by the Royal Society of Arts.

2008: Fellowship awarded competitively by the Honourable Society of Gray's Inn.
