= Orly Lobel =

Israeli-born professor of law

- אורלי לובל
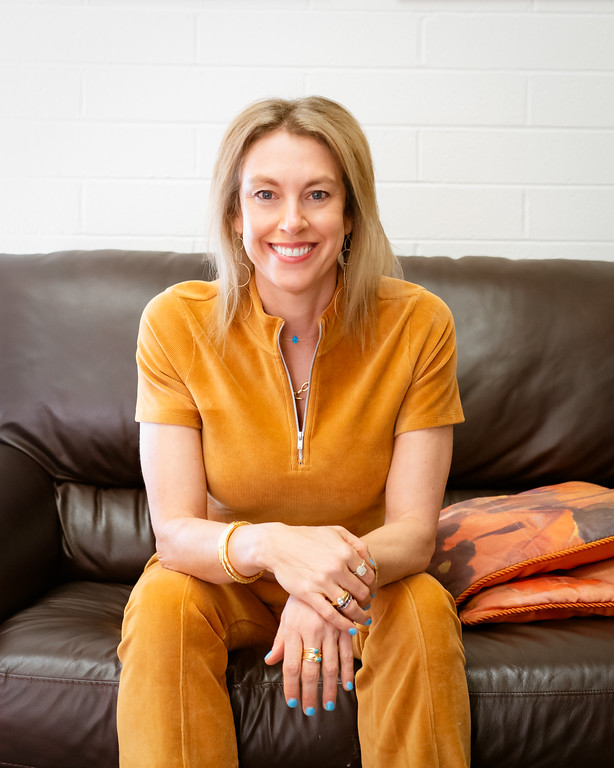
- Education: Harvard University; Tel Aviv University
- Occupations: Author and law professor
- Website: home.sandiego.edu/~lobel

Orly Lobel (Hebrew: אורלי לובל) is an author and Warren Distinguished Professor of Law at the University of San Diego (USD) School of Law. Lobel is one of the nation's foremost legal experts on labor and employment law. She is also one of the nation's top-cited young legal scholars. Along with numerous scholarly articles and dozens of essays for media publications, Lobel has written and published three books for general audiences. Her most recent book, The Equality Machine: Harnessing Digital Technology for a Brighter, More Inclusive Future (PublicAffairs 2022), was named one of The Economist's Best Books of 2022.

== Early life and education ==
Lobel graduated top of her class from Tel-Aviv University Faculty of Law in 1998. While attending law school in Tel-Aviv, Lobel was selected to represent the university as a semester exchange student at Northwestern School of Law. She earned her LL.M from Harvard Law School in 2000 before completing her Doctor of Juridical Science at Harvard Law in 2006. Lobel served as an Intelligence Commander in the Israel Defense Forces' Unit 8200, through the Talpiot Program. She also clerked on the Israeli Supreme Court.

== Legal career ==
Lobel is a Warren Distinguished Professor of Law at the University of San Diego School of Law. She is a founding member of the USD School of Law's Center for Intellectual Property and Markets and the director of the Center for Employment & Labor Policy.

Lobel has lectured and taught law students and MBA students at places such as the Yale Law School, University of California, San Diego, Tel-Aviv Law School and Beijing University. Prior to joining USD, she served as a fellow at the Harvard University Center for Ethics and the Professions, the Kennedy School of Government, and the Weatherhead Center for International Affairs.

Lobel is a member of the American Law Institute. Lobel is a mentor for the Racial Equity in Technology Policy Accelerator – a program that aims to identify, develop, and publish a set of racial justice and technology policy ideas to be implemented by the legislative and executive branches of government.

== Research ==
Lobel is one of the nation's top-cited legal scholars on labor and employment law. She is also one of the nation's top-cited young legal scholars. She has written over 40 articles published in leading law journals including the Harvard Law Journal, the Colombia Law Review and more.

Lobel has been interviewed by The New York Times, BusinessWeek, and NPR's Marketplace. In 2015, Lobel delivered a TEDx talk entitled "Secrets & Sparks".

Lobel's work has appeared in The Economist, The Wall Street Journal, Forbes, Fortune, Financial Times, Times Literary Supplement, La Repubblica, La Presse, The Australian, Times Higher Education, Above the Law, Modern Law, Yahoo!LifeStyle (Must-read books), NPR, TechDirt, The San Diego Union-Tribune, The San Francisco Chronicle, The National Law Journal, Harvard Magazine, The Sunday Times, Globe and Mail, Huffington Post, CNBC, and CNN Business.

== Awards and recognition ==
Lobel has received the Thorsnes Prize for Outstanding Legal Scholarship and the Irving Oberman Memorial Award. In 2013, Lobel was named one of the 50 Sharpest Minds in Research by The Marker Magazine.

== Bibliography ==
Books Source:

- The Equality Machine: Harnessing Digital Technology for a Brighter, More Inclusive Future, PublicAffairs, 2022
- Talent Wants to Be Free: Why We Should Learn to Love Leaks, Raids, and Free Riding (Yale University Press)
- You Don't Own Me: How Mattel v. MGA Entertainment Exposed Barbie's Dark Side (W.W. Norton and Company 2017)
- Encyclopedia of Labor and Employment Law and Economics (Edward Elgar Publishing, 2009), Co-Editor.
- Employment Law (6th ed., West Academic Hornbook Series 2019) (with Rothstein et al.)
