= Christian Nwachukwu Okeke =

Law professor

Prof. Christian Nwachukwu Okeke
- Born: 18 December 1941 (age 84); Enugu
- Occupations: Academic, Lawyer
- Title: Pro Chancellor, Godfrey Okoye University
- Awards: Pro Ecclesia et Pontifice

Academic background
- Education: Kiev State University, Free University of Amsterdam

Christian Nwachukwu Okeke is a professor of International Law, Jurisprudence and Comparative Law at Golden Gate University School of Law, San Francisco California. He is the Director of Sompong Sucharitkul Center for Advanced International Legal Studies and the director of LL.M. and S.J.D. Programs in international legal studies of the institution. He is a former Emeritus Pioneer Dean of Faculty Law at Nnamdi Azikiwe University, Awka, Nigeria, and a recipient of Pro Ecclesia et Pontifice (Cross of Honour). Currently, he is the Pro Chancellor of Godfrey Okoye University.

== Education ==
Okeke obtained his Master of Law (LL.M.) with honors (summa cum laude) from Kiev State University, Ukraine, and obtained his Doctorate in de Rechtsgeleerdheid (Ph.D.) from Free University of Amsterdam, The Netherlands.

== Career ==
Okeke joined the services of the Law Faculty, University of Nigeria, Enugu Campus (UNEC) as Lecturer 1 in 1974 and rose to Senior Lecturer in 1979. He also partnered with Charles Udenze Ilegbune to found the Law Firm, Illegbune, Okeke and Co where he was a partner for many years. In May 1985, Christian Okeke accepted a request to establish the law school at the Anambra State University of Technology (ASUTECH) in Enugu, Nigeria (which later served as the foundation for the Enugu State University of Science and Technology, the Nnamdi Azikiwe University, and the Ebonyi State University). The then-President and Vice Chancellor of ASUTECH, Cyril Agodi Onwumechili, issued the invitation and he was appointed as the pioneer Dean and Professor of Law at the ASUTECH Law Faculty. He continued to serve as the pioneer dean and professor of law at the Nnamdi Azikiwe University, Awka, when ASUTECH disintegrated in 1989 into the three universities stated above. He served as the university's first dean and professor of law at Enugu State University of Science and Technology (ESUT) from 1991 to 1995. He served as ESUT's Deputy Vice Chancellor, a solicitor and an advocate of the Supreme Court of Nigeria. In 2009, he became the pioneer Pro Chancellor and Chairman of the Governing Council of Godfrey Okoye University which he maintained up till today.

== Awards and honours ==
In 2012, Okeke was given the "Cross-Pro Ecclesia et Pontifice” (Cross of Honor) by Pope Benedict XVI. Also, there have been two Ferstrichts written in his honour; Contemporary Issues on Public International and Comparative Law: Essays in Honor of Professor Dr. Christian Nwachukwu Okeke in 2009 and International Law and Development in the Global South in January 2023 in honour of his 80th birthday.

== Membership and fellowship ==
He is a member and Editor-in-Chief of the Annual Survey of International and Comparative Law (ASICL), a member of Editorial Boards of the Comparative Law in Africa, a member of the American Society of International Law (ASIL), and the director of American Society of Comparative Law (ASCL).

== Selected publications ==
- Okeke, Christian N., The Viability and Sustainability of Landlocked States Under International Law vis-a-vis Municipal Law: The Case of South East States of Nigeria (2018).
- Okeke Christian N. The Use of International Law in the Domestic Courts of Ghana and Nigeria. 2015. Ariz. J. Int'l. & Comp. L. 371
- Okeke Christian N. 2008. The Second Scramble for Africa's Oil and Mineral Resources: Blessing or Curse? The International Lawyer
- Okeke, Christian N. (2007) "The Exeat of a Remarkable Man from the Academia: Distinguished Professor Dr. Sompong Sucharitkul: Statesman, Diplomat and Notable Scholar (rev. ed.)," Annual Survey of International & Comparative Law: Vol. 13 : Iss. 1, Article 2.
- Okeke Christian N. 2006. United States Migration Law: Essentials for Comparison.
