= Tsypkin =

Tsypkin (Russian: Цыпкин), female Tsypkina, is a Russian surname. Notable people with the name include:

- Alter Tsypkin (1891–1985), Soviet legal scholar, lawyer
- Leonid Tsypkin (1926–1982), Soviet writer and medical doctor, best known for his book Summer in Baden-Baden
