= Henry Temple =

Henry Temple may refer to:

- Henry Temple, 1st Viscount Palmerston (c. 1673–1757), Irish nobleman and British politician
- Henry Temple, 2nd Viscount Palmerston (1739–1802), grandson of the above, Irish nobleman and British politician
- Henry John Temple, 3rd Viscount Palmerston (1784–1865), son of the above, prime minister of the United Kingdom
- Henry W. Temple (1864–1955), Republican politician from Pennsylvania

== See also ==
- Henri Temple (born 1945), French professor, lawyer, and politician
- Viscount Palmerston
