= Addicott (disambiguation) =

Addicott were a people who despoiled Roman Britain between 364 and 368.

Addicott may also refer to:

- 19444 Addicott, minor planet

== People with the surname ==
- James E. Addicott, American football coach and mathematics professor
- Jeffrey Addicott, American lawyer and university professor
