= Li Gui-min =

Taiwanese politician (born 1959)

- 李貴敏
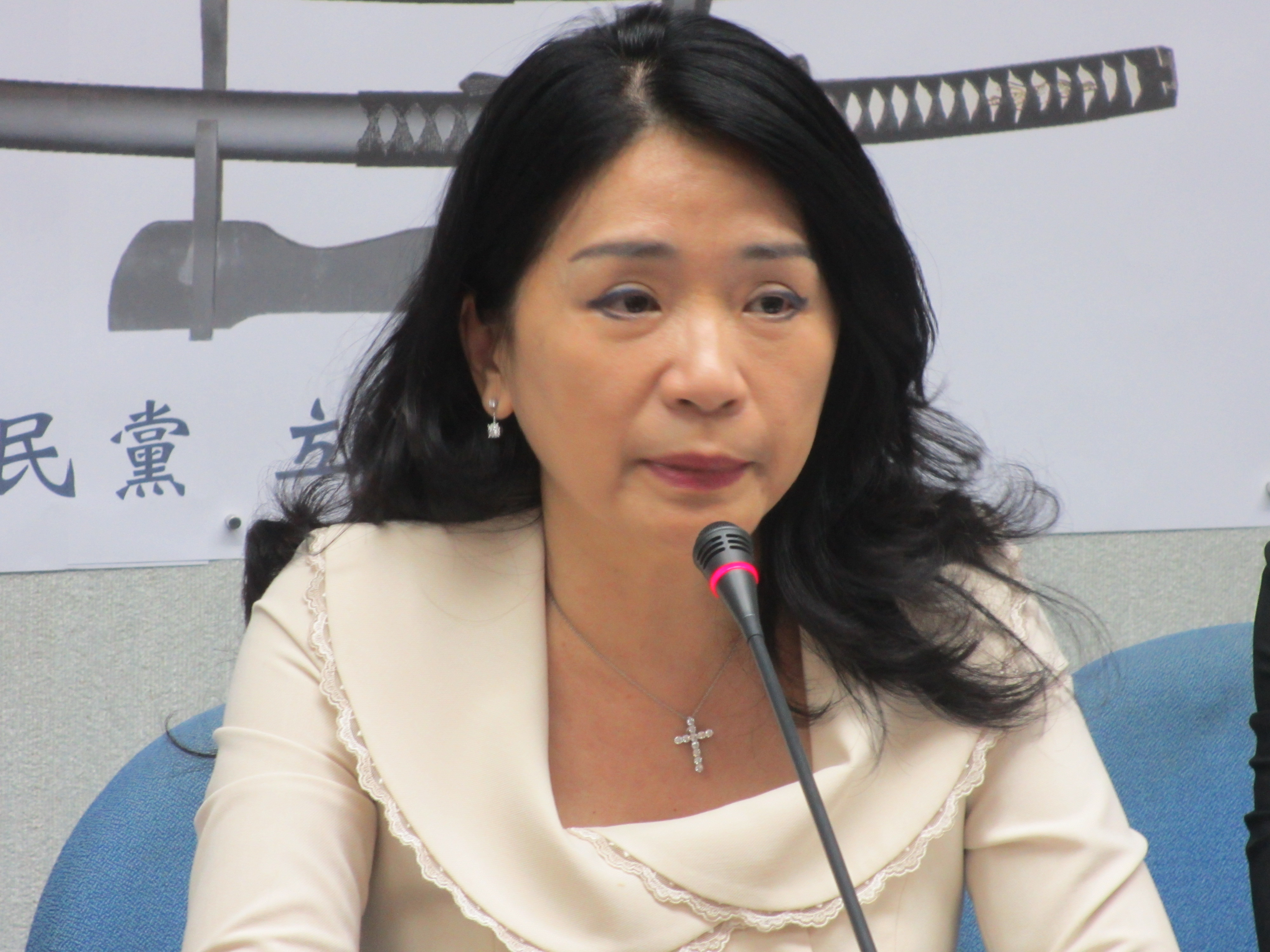

Member of the Legislative Yuan
- In office February 1, 2020 – January 31, 2024
- Preceded by: Kao Chia-yu
- Constituency: National At-Large
- In office February 1, 2012 – January 31, 2016

Personal details
- Born: 11 December 1959 (age 66)
- Party: Kuomintang
- Education: National Chengchi University (LLB); University of the Pacific (LLM, SJD)

Li Gui-min (Chinese: 李貴敏; born 11 December 1959) is a Taiwanese lawyer and politician from the Kuomintang. She was elected to the Legislative Yuan in 2012 and 2020.

== Education ==
After high school, Li attended law school at National Chengchi University and graduated with a Bachelor of Laws (LL.B.) degree. She then earned a Master of Laws (LL.M.) and a Doctor of Juridical Science (S.J.D.) from the University of the Pacific in the United States.
