= Lama Abu-Odeh =

Palestinian-American professor and author

- Education: Harvard University

Lama Abu-Odeh (Arabic: لمى أبو عودة, born 1962) is a Palestinian-American professor and author who teaches at the Georgetown University Law Center. She has written on Islamic law, feminism, and family law.

Abu-Odeh was born in Amman, Jordan. She is the daughter of Adnan Abu-Odeh, a former senator in the Jordanian House of Parliament and ambassador. She earned her LL.B. from the University of Jordan, her LL.M. from the University of Bristol, England, her MA from the University of York, England, and her S.J.D. from Harvard University. She has taught at Stanford Law School and worked for the World Bank's Middle East/North Africa division.

Abu-Odeh has also written on the Israeli–Palestinian conflict and has voiced support for binationalism and a one-state solution. Her article on the changes in Muslim family law in Egypt has been noted for its importance in the field.

== Selected publications ==
- Abu-Odeh, Lama (2003). "Law: Modern Family Law, 1800 - Present: Arab States". In Joseph, Suad (ed.). Encyclopedia of women & Islamic cultures. Leiden ; Boston, Mass: Brill. pp. 459–463. ISBN 978-90-04-12818-7.
- Abu-Odeh, Lama (December 2001). "Boston Review: The Case for Binationalism". The Boston Review. Archived from the original on October 21, 2007.
