= He Jiahong =

Chinese lawyer, academic and writer (born 1953)

- Born: May 10, 1953 (age 73); Beijing, China
- Writing career
- Genres: Fiction, crime fiction, political analysis, legal, law
- Subjects: Chinese crime, China, Chinese politics, Chinese law, legal textbooks, law textbooks

He Jiahong (Chinese: 何家弘; pinyin: Hé Jiāhóng) (born May 10, 1953) is a Chinese lawyer, academic and writer. An expert in the field of criminal justice in China, he teaches at the Renmin University of China in Beijing. In addition to his legal and teaching work, He Jiahong is also an editor and writer, publishing on legal matters, as well as writing crime novels, of which Hanging Devils: Hong Jun Investigates, also known as Crime of Blood, is best known.

He Jiahong has also held a number of part-time positions in China, including Deputy Director of The Research Centre for Criminal Justice of Renmin University of China.

== Education and career ==
He Jiahong was born in Beijing on 10 May 1953. At the age of sixteen He went to live on a farm in Heilongjiang Province, where he began writing his first novel. In 1977 He returned to Beijing, and then went on to sit and pass the university entrance exam and was eventually accepted to the Renmin University of China.

He achieved a Bachelor of Law from Renmin University of China in 1983, followed by a Master of Law in 1986. He later obtained a Doctor of Juridical Science at Northwestern University in 1993, composing his thesis on “Criminal Prosecution in the PRC and the USA: A Comparative Study”.

He has spent most of his professional career at the Renmin University of China, and has since become Director of the Institute of Evidence Law when the institute was established in 2006, and the Director of the Research Centre of Wrongful Convictions established in March 2012.

He is involved in Anti-Corruption in China, and has proposed a form of amnesty that will give officials until the end of 2013 to declare their assets publicly. Which is a similar move that Hong Kong's government adopted in 1977. In an article in the Guardian newspaper in the UK he was quoted as saying: “There were so many officials who committed corruption and it affected so many people's lives. I thought by choosing this course I could do something meaningful to change things."

In an interview featured in Voice of America, He Jiahong further raised his concerns about the state of the Chinese criminal system stating "It's just a nominal proceeding of the whole proceeding to make a decision about the case. Especially for this kind of highly political cases, the decision has already been made, but then they have to go through the trial." when referring to the trial of Chinese politician Bo Xilai.

He Jiahong is deputy director of a team that are helping to train masters students to investigate cases of occupational crimes by public officials, including interrogation of suspects and administering lie detector tests.

== Writing and editing ==
In addition to his university work, He Jiahong is a writer and editor. He has acted as chief editor for over thirty books, including treatises and textbooks such as Prosecution Comparative Study.(ISBN 978-7-80185-941-9)

Furthermore He Jiahong writes detective novels, centred around a character known as Hong Jun, a lawyer. The first book, Crime of Blood, originally written in Chinese has now been translated into French, Italian and Spanish. In 2012 the book was also translated into English, with the title Hanging Devils: Hong Jun Investigates.

According to the Shenzhen Daily in April 2011, Crime of Blood allows He to ‘combine his passion for literature and his professional knowledge of the Chinese legal system, reflecting China’s society and development with his years of experience in legal procedures and criminal investigation’.

Marilyn Mai of The Beijinger said that Crime of Blood (Hanging Devils) was "great fireside read", also adding "the case is based on true events, and the story itself is enough to keep those pages turning". In 2008, Bertrand Mialaret said "These novels are read with pleasure, the mystery plot is interesting", also noting that the central character, Hong Jun has "many moral qualities and very little interest in politics".

Catherine Sampson, of The Guardian newspaper ranked Crime of Blood among her top ten Asian crime-fiction novels.

He Jiahong’s non-fiction works in English include Criminal Prosecution in the PRC and the USA: A Comparative Study, written with Professor Emeritus Jon R. Waltz; Exploration of the Path of Fighting Corruption with Chinese Characteristics and Empirical Studies of Wrongful Convictions in Mainland China (with He Ran).

== Bibliography ==
First Series: Selected Works of He Jiahong: Crime Novels: Jiahong, He (2013). Books of Jiahong.

- Hanging Devils: Hong Jun Investigates (ISBN 978-0-670-07042-8 ISBN 0-670-07042-4)
- The Black Hole of Human Life: Crimes behind the Stock Market (ISBN 978-2-8159-0253-3)
- The Misled Region of Human Life: A Mystery of Dragon-Eye-Stone (ISBN 978-2-8159-0237-3)
- The Vicious Circle of Human Life: The Mysterious Ancient Painting (ISBN 978-2-8159-0813-9)
- The Narrow Road of Human Life: Black Bat • White Bat. (ISBN 7-80171-245-5 ISBN 978-7-80171-245-5)

Second Series: Selected Works of HE Jiahong: Legal Studies :

- From Ought to Is: Studies on the Laws of Evidence
- From Analogues to Identical: Studies on Criminal Investigation
- From Theirs to Ours: Research on Criminal Justice
- From Observation to Reflection: Critics on Foreign Major Cases (ISBN 978-7-5093-0372-6 ISBN 7-5093-0372-9)
- From Popular to Erudite: Little Thoughts on the Culture of the Rule of Law.

Third Series: Selected Works of HE Jiahong: Varieties of Law:

- Language of Evidence: New Ideas of Legal Science
- The Fictitious Truth: Lectures on Legal Evidence
- The Twisted Souls: Records of Western Crimes
- The Secret Codes of Crime: Records of Scientific Detection of Crime
- Excited Awkwardness: Facing the Media (Interviews and profiles).
