= Ted de Boer =

Dutch professor (born 1943)

Theodorus Martinus de Boer (born 11 May 1943) is an emeritus professor of private international law and comparative law at the University of Amsterdam.

== Biography ==
Born 11 May 1943 in Uithoorn, North Holland, Netherlands De Boer studied law at Utrecht University and obtained a Master of Laws degree there in 1969. Two years later he earned a further Master of Laws degree at New York University. De Boer obtained his Doctor of Juridical Science at the University of Amsterdam in 1987. He started as professor in 1987 and he retired in October 2003. He then continued as unpaid professor until 2010.

De Boer was elected a member of the Royal Netherlands Academy of Arts and Sciences in 1992.
