= Fu Kun-cheng =

Taiwanese politician (born 1951)

- 傅崐成
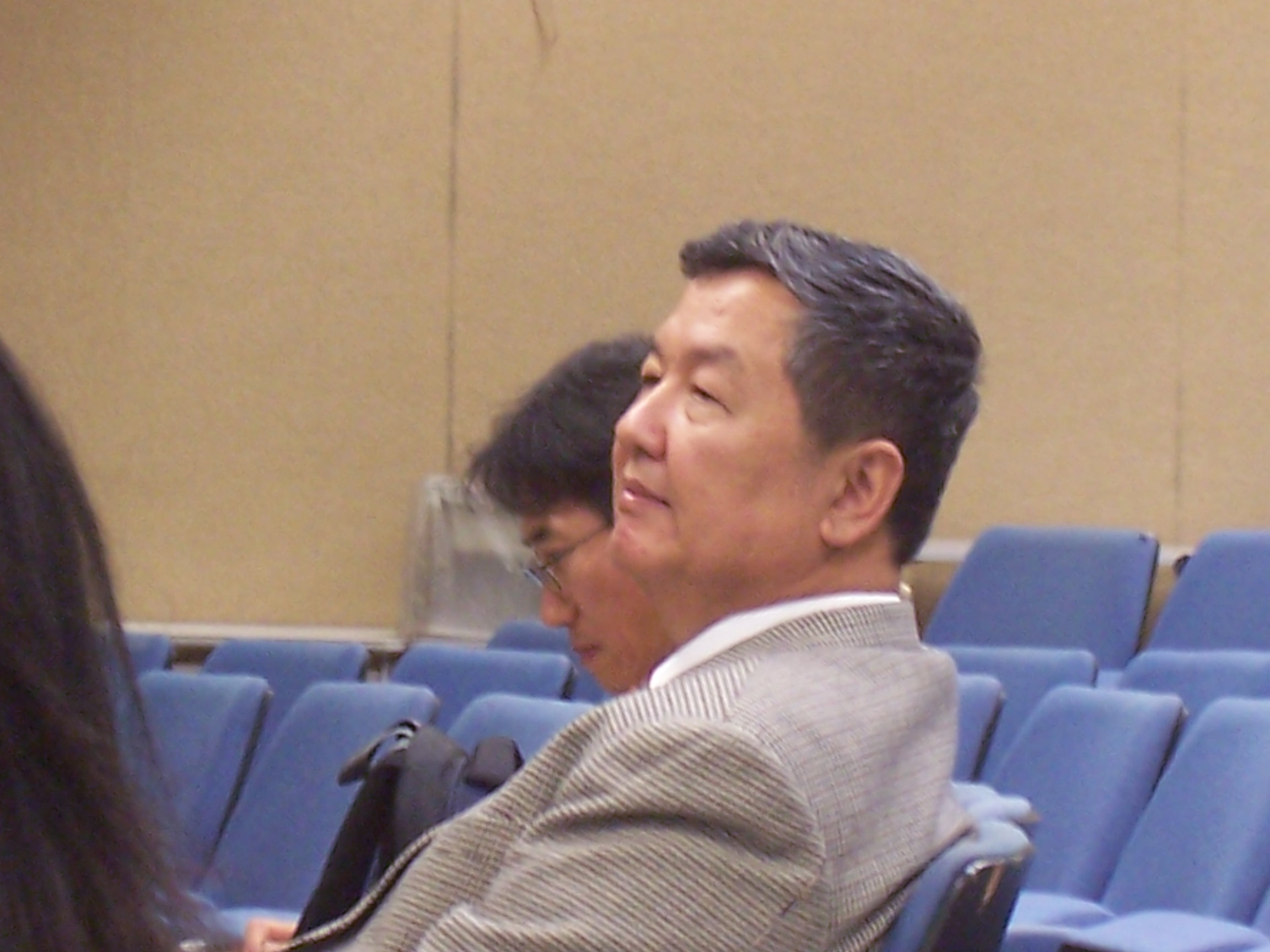
- Fu at National Ilan University in December 2009

Member of the Legislative Yuan
- In office February 1, 1996 – January 31, 1999

Personal details
- Born: November 4, 1951 (age 75) Pingtung County, Taiwan
- Party: New Party
- Education: National Taiwan University (LLB, LLM); University of Virginia (SJD)

Fu Kun-cheng (Chinese: 傅崐成; pinyin: Fù Kūnchéng; born November 4, 1951) is a Taiwanese lawyer, legal scholar, and politician.

== Education ==
Fu attended elementary school in Pingtung County, middle school in Dazhi, Zhongshan District, Taipei, and graduated from Taipei Municipal Chien Kuo High School. After high school, he attended law school at National Taiwan University and graduated with LL.B. and LL.M. degrees. He then earned an S.J.D. from the University of Virginia, where he was a doctoral student at the University of Virginia School of Law.

== Career ==
After receiving his doctorate, Fu taught as an associate professor at his alma mater, as well as National Chengchi University, Soochow University, Tamkang University, Chinese Culture University, and National Taiwan Ocean University. He was elected to the second National Assembly in December 1991, then contested the 1995 Taiwan legislative election for a seat on the Legislative Yuan as a New Party representative of Taipei County. Fu left politics in 2002, moving to China for a position at Xiamen University. He later taught at National Kinmen Institute of Technology and Shanghai Jiaotong University.
