= George Marion Johnson =

American lawyer, academic (1900–1987)

George Marion Johnson (May 22, 1900 – August 11, 1987) was an American academic administrator, tax lawyer, and professor. He was the first vice chancellor of the University of Nigeria in Nsukka, Nigeria.

== Early life and education ==
Johnson was born in Albuquerque, New Mexico and raised in San Bernardino, California; he earned Bachelor's and LL.D. degrees from the University of California, Berkeley in 1923 and 1929, and in 1938 earned a J.S.D. there, one of the first African American holders of the degree.

== Career ==
In 1929 Johnson started practicing as a tax attorney; he was subsequently the first African American California State Assistant Tax Counsel.

He moved to academia as a professor at Howard University, and then in World War II was acting General Counsel to the Fair Employment Practice Committee, which oversaw the prevention of discrimination in defense industries. In 1946 he became dean of the Howard University School of Law, where he founded the Howard Law Review Journal. He also assisted one of his predecessors, Charles Hamilton Houston, in the preparation of Supreme Court briefs on behalf of the NAACP. In 1957 he was appointed to the U.S. Commission on Civil Rights.

In 1960, when Nigeria became independent, Johnson was a founder of the University of Nigeria and was appointed its first vice chancellor. He held the position until 1964, when he was succeeded by Glen L. Taggart. He subsequently worked at Michigan State University as a professor of education and at the University of Hawaii as a professor of law and director of the Preadmission Program.

== Personal life and death ==
Johnson was married to Evelyn Johnson. He died on August 11, 1987, in Honolulu.
