= Huang Kuo-chung =

Taiwanese lawyer and politician

Huang Kuo-chung MLY
- 黃國鐘

Member of the Legislative Yuan
- In office 1 February 1996 – 31 January 1999
- Constituency: Kaohsiung 2

Personal details
- Born: 1954 (age 71–72)
- Party: Kuomintang
- Other political affiliations: New Party
- Education: National Taiwan University (LLB); Yale University (LLM, JSD)
- Profession: Lawyer

Huang Kuo-chung (Chinese: 黃國鐘; born 1954) is a Taiwanese lawyer and retired politician who served in the Legislative Yuan from 1996 to 1999.

After graduating from National Taiwan University, Huang earned an LL.M. and his J.S.D. from Yale Law School. He represented Lien Chan and James Soong during the 2004 presidential election, which was won by Chen Shui-bian. The Lien–Soong legal team argued that electoral fraud had occurred and asked the Taiwan High Court to nullify the election's result. In 2007, Huang was named to the Executive Yuan's Referendum Review Committee.
