= Nir Kedar =

Professor of law and history

- ניר קידר
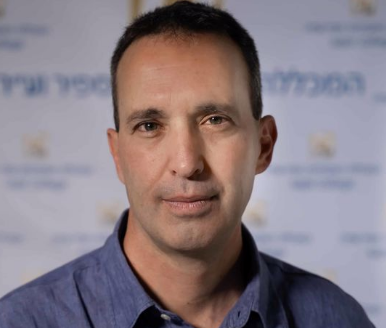
- Born: 1968 (age 57–58); Petah-Tikva, Israel
- Title: President of Sapir Academic College

Academic background
- Education: Tel Aviv University; Harvard University

Academic work
- Discipline: Law; history
- Institutions: Bar-Ilan University; Sapir Academic College

Nir Kedar (Hebrew: ניר קידר; born 1968) is an Israeli law and history professor. He is the president of Sapir Academic College.

Previously, Kedar was Sapir's Vice President for Academic Affairs, the Dean of Sapir Law School and a professor at Bar-Ilan University Faculty of Law.

Kedar’s research focuses on Israeli history, modern legal history, legal and political theory, and comparative law.

== Early life and education ==
Nir Kedar was born in Petach Tikva. He studied history and law at Tel Aviv University and received B.A. and LL.B in 1995 (magna cum laude).

He then clerked for the President of Israel’s Supreme Court, Aharon Barak.

Kedar continued his studies at Harvard Law School and received his S.J.D. in 2000.

== Academic career ==
Kedar joined the Faculty of Law at Bar Ilan University in 2000. In 2013 he was appointed as Dean of Sapir Law School, a position he held until 2017. Kedar became Vice President for Academic Affairs at Sapir in 2019, and became a full professor in 2021. In July 2022 he was appointed President of Sapir Academic College.

During the years, Kedar held visiting academic positions at Piemonte Orientale Law Faculty, Italy, Heidelberg University, Germany and at NYU.

== Research ==
Kedar’s research combines his two major expertise: history and law, where his main fields of interest are Israeli history and modern legal history.

His work focuses on David Ben-Gurion’s civil thoughts (Mamlakhtiyut) and actions and his ideas on religion, culture and messianism.

Other research areas are the history of Israel’s judicial system; law and Identity in Israel and comparative law.

== President of Sapir Academic College ==
During Kedar's leadership, the college has supported social involvement projects to help Bedouin students, students from the neighboring peripheral cities, and those with physical and learning disabilities reach higher education.

Following the October 7 attacks, Kedar has coordinated the College's efforts to evacuate staff and students, establish emergency funds, and provide psychological support. Sapir opened for frontal learning in March 2024.

In May 2024 Kedar signed a memorandum of understanding with The Hebrew University on establishing a new faculty for health professions on the Sapir campus. Sapir has also announced that a new faculty for advanced technology will open in 2026. Following the announcement, Kedar said that one of Sapir’s missions "is to develop into a large and leading academic institution in research, teaching and social involvement".

== Publications ==
=== Selected books ===
- Nir Kedar, Mamlakhtiyut: David Ben-Gurion’s Civic Thought, Ben-Gurion University Press & Yad Ben-Zvi 2009. (Hebrew).
- Nir Kedar, Ben-Gurion and the Constitution, (Hebrew) Bar-Ilan University Press & Dvir Press, 2015.
- Nir Kedar, Law and Identity in Israel: A Century of Debate, Cambridge University Press 2019.
- Nir Kedar, Blue and White Law: Identity and Law in Israel, A Century-Long Polemic, Ben-Gurion University Press, The Open University of Israel Press and Tel Aviv University Press 2017 (Hebrew).
- Nir Kedar, Ben-Gurion and the Foundation of Israeli Democracy, Indiana University Press 2021.

=== Selected articles ===
- Nir Kedar, “Ben-Gurion’s Mamlakhtiyut: Etymological and Theoretical Roots,” 7.2 Israel Studies (2002) 117-133.
- Nir Kedar, “Law, Culture and Civil Codification in a Mixed Legal System,” 22 Canadian Journal of Law and Society (2007) 177-195.
- Nir Kedar, “A Civilian Commander in Chief: Ben-Gurion’s Mamlakhtiyut, the Army and the Law,” 14:2 Israel Affairs (2008), 202-217.
- Nir Kedar, “Democracy and Judicial Autonomy in Israel’s Early Years,” 15.1 Israel Studies (2010), pp. 25–46.
- Avi Bareli and Nir Kedar, Israeli Republicanism, Israel Democracy Institute 2011 (Hebrew).
- Nir Kedar, “Ben-Gurion and the Place of Judaism in Israel,” Journal of Israeli History 32:2 (2013) pp. 157–174.
- Nir Kedar, “A Scholar, Teacher, Judge, and Jurist in a Mixed Jurisdiction: The Case of Aharon Barak,” 62 Loyola Law Review (2016), pp. 659–689.
- Nir Kedar, “The rule of law in Israel,” 23.3 Israel Studies (2018), pp. 164–171
