= Vikramaditya Khanna =

American lawyer

- Education: Harvard Law School (S.J.D.)
- Known for: Research on corporate law, white-collar crime, and law in India
- Notable work: Founding editor of India Law Abstracts and White Collar Crime Abstracts on SSRN
- Awards: John M. Olin Faculty Fellowship (2002–2003)
- Scientific career
- Fields: Corporate law, Law and economics, Comparative law
- Workplaces: University of Michigan Law School; Harvard Law School; Columbia Law School; Yale Law School; Stanford Law School

Vikramaditya Khanna is a professor of law at the University of Michigan Law School, and the founding and current editor of the India Law Abstracts and the White Collar Crime Abstracts on the Social Science Research Network.

Khanna was born in India to academic parents and spent his early childhood in Kenya and the United States before moving to New Zealand, where he completed high school and earned both his bachelor’s and first law degree by the age of 21.

He earned his S.J.D. at Harvard Law School and has been visiting faculty at Harvard Law School, a senior research fellow at Columbia Law School and Yale Law School, and a visiting scholar at Stanford Law School. He was a recipient of the John M. Olin Faculty Fellowship for 2002–2003, and his areas of research and teaching interest include corporate and securities laws, law in India, corporate governance in emerging markets, corporate crime, corporate and managerial liability, and law and economics. He is a faculty member of the International Policy Center at the University of Michigan.

Before joining the University of Michigan Law School as a full professor in 2004, he taught at Northwestern University and Boston University, becoming one of Michigan’s youngest tenured professors at the age of 32.

In 2010, Khanna was appointed a Distinguished Visiting Professor at O.P. Jindal Global University in Sonipat, India, as part of a partnership between the University of Michigan Law School and Jindal Global Law School. He co-directs the Joint Centre for Global Corporate and Financial Law & Policy, established under a memorandum of understanding between the two institutions to promote collaborative research, faculty and student exchanges, and academic conferences. The center focuses on topics such as financial market regulation and corporate governance in the United States, India, and other jurisdictions.

Khanna testified before of the U.S. Senate Judiciary Committee on matters related to white-collar crime. He was appointed special master in a dispute between an Indian company and an American company. Khanna discussed his research on India at the Securities and Exchange Board of India. Khanna's papers have been published in a number of academic journals including the Harvard Law Review, Michigan Law Review, Journal of Empirical Legal Studies, Boston University Law Review, and the Georgetown Law Journal. He has given talks at Harvard, Columbia, Berkeley, Wharton, Stanford, Yale, European Financial Management Association Annual Meeting, American Law & Economics Association Annual Meeting, Conference on Empirical Legal Studies, NBER, and a number of venues in the US, India, China, Turkey, Canada, Greece and Singapore.

Khanna has taught the following courses; Enterprise Organization, Corporate Lawyer: Law & Ethics, Securities Regulation, Corporate Governance and Stock Market Development: India, China and Other Large Emerging Markets, Law & Economic Development: India; Corporate & White Collar Crime; Impact of Sarbanes-Oxley on Doing Business.
