= Ronen Avraham =

Israeli jurist

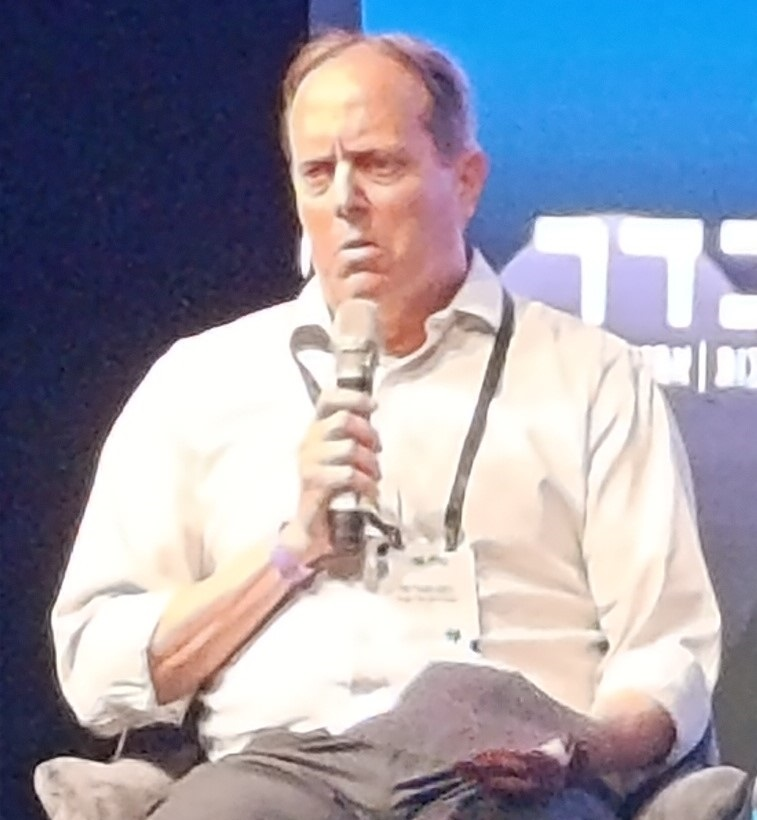
- Born: November 24, 1969 (age 56); Petah Tikva, Israel
- Education: University of Michigan School of Law (SJD, LLM); Bar-Ilan University, School of Law (LLB); Bar-Ilan University, School of Business Administration (MA)
- Scientific career
- Fields: Tort law, Healthcare Law, Contract Law, Theories of Justice
- Workplaces: The University of Texas School of Law

Ronen Avraham (Hebrew: רונן אברהם; born November 24, 1969) is a Senior Lecturer at the University of Texas School of Law and a professor at the Buchmann Faculty of Law at Tel Aviv University. His primary focus is on the economics of law, specifically healthcare law, tort law, and contract law. Prior to joining the University of Texas School of Law, Avraham was an Assistant then Associate Professor at Northwestern University from 2003 to 2007. Additionally, he served as a Visiting Assistant Professor at Tel Aviv and Bar-Ilan Universities where he instructed on Distributive Justice and Economic Analysis of Law. In 2001, he was a lecturer at the University of Michigan School of Law.

Avraham's degrees are: an SJD in 2003 from the University of Michigan School of Law, an LLM from the University of Michigan Law School in 1999; an LLB in 1998 from Bar-Ilan University, Israel, School of Law, where he was the valedictorian; and an M.A. in 1998 from Bar-Ilan University, Israel, School of Business Administration. Additionally, Avraham was the John M. Olin Fellow at the University of Michigan, School of Law from 2000 to 2001. He clerked for the Honorable Justice Theodore Or, Israel Supreme Court.

Avraham created and published the Database of State Tort Law Reform (DSTLR), which is currently in its fifth edition. The DSTLR is a comprehensive and complete dataset of the most prevalent state tort law reforms from 1980 to 2012. The database is maintained for use by legal researchers across the globe. It has greatly eased empirical research into the effects of tort reform, and has often been cited in academic papers.

Much of Avraham's work has looked at medical malpractice and tort reform. In the midst of the 2009-2010 healthcare reform debate, he proposed a system of private regulation for medicine.
