= Oleg Krassov =

Oleg Igorevich Krassov (Russian: Олег Игоревич Крассов; 26 November 1952 in Moscow – 24 August 2017) was a Doctor of Juridical Science, Master of Laws and professor at Moscow State University.

== Education ==
He began studying at the Lomonosov Moscow State University Faculty of Law in 1970 and graduated in 1975.

He studied full-time at the graduate school of the Institute of State and Law, Academy of Sciences of the USSR, from 1975 to 1979.

He defended his dissertation on the “Legal Regime of the State Forestry Fund Lands” (thesis supervisor – I.A. Ikonitskaya, Senior Researcher) on January 23, 1979. The defense took place at the Institute of State and Law, Academy of Sciences of the USSR.

He defended his doctoral thesis on the “Right to Forest Use in the USSR” in 1991. The defense took place at the Institute for State and Law, Academy of Sciences of the USSR.

Oleg Krassov was awarded the academic title of Doctor of Juridical Science on January 10, 1992 and academic rank of professor on December 22, 1993.

== Career ==
Oleg Krassov worked at the Institute for State and Law of the Russian Academy of Sciences in the position of senior research officer from 1978 to 1992. He was director of the Russian Federation Constitutional Court Department of Environmental and Land Law. He combined working at the Russian Federation Constitutional Court with teaching as he was employed in the position of professor in the Department Of Environmental and Agrarian Law of Moscow University of Law from 1992 to 1995.

He has been working at the Faculty of Law since September 1, 1995. He gives lecture courses on “Land Law” and “Environmental Law” (including within a framework of the Faculty of Law International Legal Programme at the International Center of Lomonosov Moscow State University in Geneva, Switzerland). He gives a special course on “Topical Issues of the Natural Resources Law.”

He is a member of Lomonosov Moscow State University Dissertation Council D 501.001.99 (Faculty of Law).

He interned at the University of Illinois at Urbana–Champaign College of Law in 1990 and 1991, and holds the LLM degree.

Professor Oleg Krassov, Doctor of Juridical Science worked as a lawyer for a long time, and he was a member of Inter-Republic Bar Association from 1995 to 1997, and a member of Iniurcolleguia, Attorneys-at-Law. As an Iniurcolleguia lawyer, he won the first Russian arbitral case on the contract of sale of an enterprise as an asset complex (see details: Russian Federation Supreme Arbitration Court Plenum Presidium Act on the case # 951/96 of 20.08.1996, O.I. Krassov). “The First Lawsuit on the Contract of Sale of an Enterprise Lasted a Thousand Days” // Business lawyer. 1997. # 11).

He has also participated as an expert in the London Court of International Arbitration trial of the case of annulment of the contract of sale of land plots reserved for state needs. Attorney Oleg Krassov won the arbitration proceeding for the legal claim of the investment company against Krasnodar Krai Department of Property Relations on privatization of a large land plot on The Black Sea coast and building it up, etc.

Oleg Krassov, Doctor of Juridical Science, has extensive experience in consulting and preparing expert reports. For instance it, was Mr. Krassov who:

- prepared the expert report on the case of legality of building the cultural and business complex Ohta by JSC Gazprom in Saint Petersburg;
- proved groundlessness of compensation claims faced by a large timber company on compensation of environmental damage for not removing brush wood from cutting areas;
- prepared the expert report on the Russian Federation Supreme Court case on repealing several provisions of the procedure of estimating damage caused to water objects by breaking water legislation approved by the Russian Federation Ministry of Natural Resources order of March 30, 2007;
- consulted for a major investment development company on the issue of purchasing a land plot with a total area of 256 hectares in Moscow region;
- represented interests of a major oil and gas company involved in the case of JSC Gazprom claim against the Russian Ministry of Natural Resources and Federal Agency for Subsoil Use;
- proved legality of actions of Surgut Administration on the procedure of granting land plots in an auction and without auctioning;
- proved legality of building tourist infrastructure facilities on the tourist complex land with permission to use it for “repairing vessels, building slipways, and tourism management” within industrial other special purpose lands, etc.

Currently, Oleg Krassov is a member of Lomonosov Moscow State University Dissertation Council: D 501.001.99 (Faculty of Law).

== Legislative activity ==
He has extensive experience in legislation. He has taken part in developing a number of normative legal acts:

- Provisions on forest lease in the USSR;
- Fundamentals of legislation on settlements, urban development, and architecture of the USSR and union republics;
- Fundamentals of forestry legislation of the Russian Federation;
- Fundamentals of water legislation of the Russian Federation;
- Russian Federation subsoil law;
- Federal law “On Environmental Protection”;
- Federal law “On Environmental Appraisal”;
- Federal law “On Environmental Safety”;
- Federal law “On Land Restoration”;
- Federal law “On Ecological Disaster Zones”;
- Forestry code of the Russian Federation, etc.

== Publication ==
He is the author of more than 140 published research papers including monographs, commentaries to pieces of legislation, textbooks, and study guides (including co-authorship):

- “Land law.” Textbook. M.: Norma. 2012;
- “Environmental Law.” Textbook. M.: Norma. 2012;
- Commentary to the Russian Federation Land Code. M.: Norma. 2009. (recommended by the Judicial Department under the Supreme Court of the Russian Federation to courts of general jurisdiction);
- “Environmental Law.” Russia: Norma. 2008;
- “Land Law Dictionary” – M. Gorodets. 200;
- Commentary to the Russian Federation Forestry code. M., Norma. 2007;
- “Land law.” M., Lawyer, 2007.-671 p.;
- “Land law: Textbook.” – Second edition, revised. M.: Lawyer, 2004. – 671 p.;
- “Environmental Law: Study Guide for Higher Education Institutions.” – M.: Norma. 2004. – 576 p.;
- “Land Law in Contemporary Russia.” M.: “Delo” Publishing House. 2003. – 624 p.;
- “Environmental Law.” M.: “Norma” Publishing House, 2003. – 320 p.;
- “Natural Resources of Russia: Commentary to Legislation.” M.: Delo, 2002. – 816 p.;
- Commentary to the Russian Federation Land Code. M.: Lawyer. 2002. – 779 p.;
- Commentary to the Russian Federation Law “On Subsoil.” M.: Lawyer. 2002. – 480 p.;
- Commentary to the Russian Federation Urban Development Code. M.: Lawyer. 2001. – 718 p.;
- “Russian Federation Water Code” (article-by-article commentary) // Law. 2001. # 5. P.5-35;
- “Environmental Law.” – M.: “Delo” Publishing House, 2001. – 767 p.;
- “Right to Private Land Ownership.” – M.: Lawyer. 2000. – 379 p.;
- Land Law: Textbook.” – M.: Lawyer. 2000. – 624 p.;
- Right to Private Land Ownership: Purchase and Sale, Lease, Privatization, Judicial Defense.” M.: White Alfars. 1995 – 144 p.;
- Commentary to the Fundamentals of the Russian Federation forestry legislation. M.: Jurid. Lit. 1995 – 280 p.p.;
- Commentary to the Russian Federation Water Code / M.: Justiceinform. 1997. – 327 p. (co-authorship);
- “Legal Regime of the State Forestry Fund Lands.” M.: Nauka. 1985.
- “Forest Use Right in the USSR.” M.: Nauka. 1991;
- “Right of Ownership of Forests” // Environmental law. 2006. # 2, 3;
- “Legal Requirements to Environmental Protection in Urban Development” // Legislation and economy. 2001. # 3. P. 35-45;
- “Contemporary Land Legislation in Questions and Answers of Professors of the Department of Environmental and Land Law, Faculty of Law, Lomonosov Moscow State University” // Environmental Law of Russia. Digest of the Research and Practice Conference. Fifth issue. 2005–2007: Study Guide for Higher Education Institutions / Edited by A.K. Golichenkov. M.: Forgreifer. P.332–334 (co-authorship with A.K. Golichenkov, G.A. Volkov, M.I. Vasilieva and T.V. Petrova);
- “Legal Regime of Lands as a Legal Category” // Environmental Law of Russia: Digest of Research and Practice Conferences. Second issue. 1999–2000 / Edited by A.K. Golichenkov. Compilers – A.K. Golichenkov and I.A. Ignatieva. M.: POLTEKS. 2001.P. 142–145;
- “Legal Regulation of Building Up and Zoning Settlements. Legal Regime of Certain Types of Zones” // Legislation and economy. 2001. # 7. P. 35–73;
- “Order of Elaborating, Approving, and Examining Urban Development Documentation. General Plans and Projects, Urban and Rural Boundaries” // Legislation and economy. 2001. # 6. P. 28–50;
- “Peculiarities of Legal Regulation of Using Settlement Land in Urban Development Legislation” // Legislation and economy .2001. # 5. P. 31–49;
- Commentary to the wildlife legislation // Legislation and economy. 2001. # 9. P. 4–57;
- “Urban Development Law of Russia” // Environmental Law of Russia: Digest of Research and Practice Conferences. Second issue. 1999–2000 // Edited by A.K. Golichenkov. Compilers: A.K. Golichenkov and I.A. Ignatieva. M.: POLTEKS. 2001. P. 385–389;
- “Formation of the Institution of Private Property Right in Russia” // Environmental Law of Russia: Digest of Research and Practice Conferences. 1996–1998 / Edited by A.K. Golichenkov. Compilers: A.K. Golichenkov and I.A. Ignatieva. M.: Zertsalo. 1999. P. 367–371;
- “Natural Resources Law as a Branch of Law. New Program of the Curriculum” // Environmental Law of Russia: Digest of Research and Practice Conferences 1996–1998 / Edited by A.K. Golichenkov. Compilers: A.K. Golichenkov and I.A. Ignatieva. M. Zertsalo. 1999. P. 115–118;
- “Certain Constitutional Aspects of Land Relations” // Environmental Law of Russia: Digest of Research and Practice Conferences 1996–1998 / Edited by A.K. Golichenkov. Compilers: A.K. Golichenkov and I.A. Ignatieva. M. Zertsalo. 1999. P. 157–159;
- “Right of State Ownership of Natural Resources” // State and law. 1995. # 9, etc.

While working at Lomonosov Moscow State University Faculty of Law, Oleg Krassov served as the thesis supervisor of six candidates of juridical sciences (N.G. Narysheva, E.N. Pugach, N.L. Lisina, A.A. Minaeva, N.A. Golysheva and I.S. Ivaschuk). Two of them, N.G. Narysheva and A.A. Minaeva, work in the department at the present time.

Professor Oleg Krassov, Doctor of Juridical Science, is mentioned in 240 sources in the ConsultantPlus reference system databases.
