= Edith Fisch =

American lawyer

Edith L. Fisch (March 3, 1923 – August 3, 2006) was an American jurist and legal scholar.

Fisch was born in New York City and grew up in Brooklyn. She was disabled by poliomyelitis at age 12 and lived the rest of her life in a wheelchair. She attended Brooklyn College for undergraduate studies, graduating with a B.S. in chemistry in 1945. When she earned three law degrees from Columbia Law School in 1948, 1949, and 1950, she became the first woman to earn a J.S.D. at Columbia and the first student there to earn all three law degrees. The professors at Columbia discouraged her from going on to teach law despite her ambition to do so, but she taught at the New York Law School from 1962 to 1965, becoming the first female law professor in New York State. She is the author or co-author of the law textbooks The Cy Pres Doctrine in the U.S. (1951), Fisch on New York Evidence (1959), and Charities and Charitable Foundations (1974), and was president of the New York Women's Bar Association from 1970 to 1971.

== See also ==
- Ada Kepley, the first woman to graduate law school
