= Wayne LaFave =

Wayne R. LaFave (born 1931) is an American legal scholar who specializes in the Fourth Amendment to the U.S. Constitution and serves as the David C. Baum Professor of Law Emeritus at the University of Illinois College of Law.

== Life and career ==
LaFave was born in 1931. He attended the University of Wisconsin as an undergraduate, then studied at the University of Wisconsin Law School, where he earned Bachelor of Laws and Doctor of Juridical Science degrees.

He has been a faculty member at the University of Illinois College of Law since 1961. He was the first associate dean and the first named professor at the College. He has also taught at the University of Michigan Law School and Villanova University. He is a recognized expert on the Fourth Amendment law and has published a multi-volume treatise on the subject called Search and Seizure.

He has co-authored a seven volume treatise on Criminal Procedure. He is also the author of the Modern Criminal Law casebook and the Criminal Law hornbook. His three-volume treatise on Substantive Criminal Law – first published in 1986 (in two volumes, co-authored with Austin W. Scott) and in its third edition (2018) as of 2022, of which the hornbook is an abridgement – is generally considered the standard contemporary reference on the subject, having been cited at least 40 times in decisions of the U.S. Supreme Court.
