= Quintin Johnstone =

American legal scholar (1915–2014)

- Born: March 29, 1915; Chicago, Illinois, U.S.
- Died: June 27, 2014 (aged 99); Hamden, Connecticut, U.S.
- Education: University of Chicago (BA, JD); Cornell University (LLM); Yale University (JSD)
- Occupation: Law professor
- Years active: 1947–2011

Quintin Johnstone (March 29, 1915 – June 27, 2014) was an American legal scholar. He served as the Justus S. Hotchkiss Professor of Law at Yale Law School, where he was an authority on property law and land transactions, and was later an academic at New York Law School.

Johnstone received his undergraduate and legal education at the University of Chicago. After beginning a career in academia, he obtained additional degrees from Cornell and Yale Law School. The majority of Johnstone's tenure as a law professor was spent at Yale University, where he advocated for the teaching of property law and took an active role in recruiting international students. Johnstone also co-founded the law school of Addis Ababa University in 1967, establishing the first of such institution in Ethiopia.

At Yale, Johnstone assumed major administrative positions. He was remembered for being a "strong supporter of empirical work and interdisciplinary approaches to law" and "more concerned with the relation of legal education to the professor than any other member of the faculty". Upon his death in 2014, Robert Post, the dean of Yale Law School, described him as "an iconic figure" at the institution.

== Early life and education ==
Johnstone was born in Chicago, Illinois, on March 29, 1915. He was raised in Hyde Park and attended the University of Chicago Laboratory Schools for primary and secondary education. Due to the close proximity of his home to the University of Chicago, Johnson became acquainted with professors there who inspired him to enter academia. Johnstone attended that university, where he obtained his Bachelor of Arts and served as co-captain of the track team, then attended the University of Chicago Law School, graduating with a Juris Doctor (J.D.) degree. Regarding his time as a law student, Johnstone later recalled the experience as "typical". He was admitted to the bar of Illinois in 1939.

After a year of study, Johnstone obtained a Master of Laws (LL.M.) from Cornell Law School in 1941. He subsequently went to Yale Law School, becoming one of six students in the doctorate program to have already taught at domestic law schools, and graduated in 1951 with his Doctor of Juridical Science (J.S.D.). Professor Myres S. McDougal was his doctoral advisor at Yale.

== Career ==
After graduating from Cornell Law, Johnstone worked briefly in private practice before becoming an attorney in the Office of Price Administration. In 1947, he became an assistant professor at the Willamette University College of Law, later joining the faculty of the University of Kansas as an associate professor in 1950. After five years of teaching, Johnstone became a visiting professor at Yale Law School in 1955, with President Alfred Whitney Griswold announcing his appointment as an associate professor on August 10, 1956, alongside future-judge Ellen Ash Peters. He rose to a full-time professorship in 1959, and received the Law School's appointment as the Justus S. Hotchkiss Professor of Law in 1964.

From 1967 until 1969, Johnstone took a leave from Yale to move to Ethiopia, where he co-founded the Haile Selassie I University Law School of Addis Ababa University and served as its dean. Having previously been stationed in Tanzania, he grew concerned that African legal education too closely mirrored the West and advocated for relinquishing control of the American-governed law school to native Ethiopians. Johnstone also aimed to train future students for government office at the university, replacing foreign professors on the faculty with Ethiopian ones.

Johnstone achieved emeritus status at Yale Law in 1985, and assumed a professorship at the New York Law School (NYLS) that same year, becoming a professor emeritus at NYLS in 2000. He chaired the Graduate Committee at Yale, efficiently managing a controversial program, and oversaw the school's admissions for a period. He was alone in teaching the specialty of property law, and made multiple unsuccessful efforts to increase the number of faculty in the field, though succeeded on only one occasion. During a meeting of the Yale Governing Board, he persuaded the faculty to hire Charles A. Reich, who expressed interest in teaching property law, and argued for the importance of teaching property. Johnstone was also noted for his concern regarding the legal profession, which had been a focus of his scholarly works.

Johnstone gained a reputation for being among the toughest graders at Yale Law. With no class rankings at the school, he remembered its absence as meaning "less push for top grades than there might be at other places". Both Anita Hill and Justice Clarence Thomas were among his students. Johnstone taught Thomas in three classes, remembering him as a serious student that "performed very well" and who "[took] stands and aggressively [defended] them" in class. In considering the importance of Johnstone's teaching of the essentials of law, Judge Ralph K. Winter Jr. likened his and Joseph W. Bishop Jr.'s (Note: Sam Harris Professor of Law at Yale Law School. Bishop Jr. died on May 19, 1985.) eventual retirement to being "the equivalent of a loss of 20% of the faculty" at Yale Law School.

Throughout his career, Johnstone received multiple accolades for his legal service. He was awarded an honorary degree by Quinnipiac University in 1993. In 1996, the Connecticut Bar Association awarded him its John Eldred Shields Distinguished Professional Service Award for outstanding service to the legal community. Johnstone was also a member of the Connecticut Bar Foundation's board of directors and served as its president from 1987 until 1991. On June 2, 2011, Johnstone was given the Service to the Profession Award by the Connecticut Law Tribune, where he previously had been the chair of the editorial board from 1999 to 2011, and the Tribune renamed it in his honor afterwards. The Connecticut Bar Association presented him its Tapping Reeve Legal Educator Award on April 4, 2014, in recognition of his longstanding contributions to legal education. The CATIC Foundation established two memorial prizes in his honor: the Quintin Johnstone Scholarship, presented to students interested in property law, and the Quintin Johnstone Prize in Real Property Law, awarded to a student of Yale Law "who has demonstrated excellence in the area of real property law".

== Personal life and death ==
Johnstone had a wife, Nancy, and two children: Robert Dale Johnstone and Katherine Mary Johnstone. He died at 99 years of age on June 27, 2014, at his home in Hamden, Connecticut. A memorial service was held at Yale Law School on November 9, 2014. Robert Post, then the dean of the school, said of him:

Quintin Johnstone was an iconic figure at the Yale Law School [...] He taught here for more than 55 years, and perhaps instructed more students than any other teacher in the School’s history. His mastery of the intricacies of property law was treasured by generations of students, as were his insights into the legal profession. He was still actively teaching at 96 years of age. We shall miss him deeply. A treasured landmark has passed away.

== Selected publications ==
=== Books ===
- Berger, Curtis J.; Johnstone, Quintin; Tracht, Marshall; Axelrod, Allan (1993). Land Transfer and Finance: Cases and Materials (Textbook). Aspen Publishing. ISBN 9780316092784.
- Johnstone, Quintin; Wenglinsky, Martin (1985). Paralegals: Progress and Prospects of a Satellite Occupation. Praeger Publishers (published November 19, 1985). ISBN 978-0313249457.
- Johnstone, Quintin; Hopson, Dan (1967). Lawyers and Their Work: An Analysis of the Legal profession in the United States and England. Bobbs-Merrill (published January 1, 1967). ASIN B0006BOY2I.
- Johnstone, Quintin (1951). Survey of the Legal Profession: Legal and Clinic Reports.

=== Journals ===
- Johnstone, Quintin; York, Kenneth H. (Autumn 1949). "Some Suggested Additions to the Small Law School's Program". Journal of Legal Education. 2 (1). Association of American Law Schools: 96–103. JSTOR 42890259.
- Johnstone, Quintin (Summer 1951). "Law School Legal Aid Clinics". Journal of Legal Education. 3 (4). Association of American Law Schools: 535–554. JSTOR 42890509.
- Johnstone, Quintin (November 1952). "Child Custody" (PDF). University of Kansas Law Review. 1 (1): 37–50.
- Johnstone, Quintin (May 1953). "Divorce Dismissals: A Field Study" (PDF). University of Kansas Law Review. 1 (3): 245–257.
- Johnstone, Quintin (1954–1955). "An Evaluation of the Rules of Statutory Interpretation" (PDF). Kansas Law Review. 3 (1): 1–25. Archived from the original (PDF) on 2023-07-04.
- Johnstone, Quintin (1955). "Die Entwicklung von Familiengerichten in den Vereinigten Staaten". Archiv für die civilistische Praxis. 154 (1): 34–44. JSTOR 40993419.
- Johnstone, Quintin (February 1957). "Title Insurance" (PDF). Yale Law Journal. 66 (4): 492–524. doi:10.2307/794045. JSTOR 794045. Archived from the original (PDF) on 2023-07-05.
- Johnstone, Quintin (Winter 1958). "The Federal Urban Renewal Program" (PDF). The University of Chicago Law Review. 25 (2): 301–354. doi:10.2307/1598136. JSTOR 1598136. Archived from the original (PDF) on 2023-05-31.
- Johnstone, Quintin (October 1959). "Judicial Consideration of Moral Doctrine in Government Land Use Control Litigation" (PDF). University of Kansas Law Review. 8 (1): 1–17. Archived from the original (PDF) on 2023-07-05.
- Johnstone, Quintin (1964). "American Participation in East African Legal Education". Journal of Legal Education. 16 (3). Association of American Law Schools: 312–316. JSTOR 42891577.
- Johnstone, Quintin (Spring 1967). "Models for Curricular Reform" (PDF). University of Miami Law Review. 21 (3): 544–557. Archived from the original (PDF) on 2023-07-04.
- Johnstone, Quintin (June 1968). "Annual Report of the Dean". Journal of Ethiopian Law. 5 (1): 15–22 – via HeinOnline.
- Johnstone, Quintin (1968). "Roundtable on Curricular Reform". Journal of Legal Education (Introduction). 20 (4). Association of American Law Schools: 387–388. JSTOR 42891888.
- Johnstone, Quintin (1970). "Student Discontent and Education Reform in the Law Schools". Journal of Legal Education. 23 (2). Association of American Law Schools: 255–275. JSTOR 42892079.
- Johnstone, Quintin (1971–1972). "American Assistance to African Legal Education" (PDF). Tulane Law Review. 46 (4): 657–723. Archived from the original (PDF) on 2023-07-05.
- Johnstone, Quintin (1976–1977). "Government Control of Urban Land Development in Australia: A Model for Comparison" (PDF). Tulane Law Review. 51 (3): 547–610. Archived from the original (PDF) on 2023-07-05.
- Johnstone, Quintin (Winter 1978). "Australian Green Bans: Trade Union Activism Restricting Urban Development". The Urban Lawyer. 10 (1): 115–129. JSTOR 27890805.
- Johnstone, Quintin; Flood, John A. (1982). "Paralegals in English and American Law Offices". Windsor Yearbook of Access to Justice. 2. University of Windsor: 152–192.
- Johnstone, Quintin (1984). "Some Thoughts on Legislation in Legal Education" (PDF). Mercer Law Review. 35 (3): 845–854. Archived from the original (PDF) on 2023-07-07.
- Johnstone, Quintin (Spring 1988). "Land Transfers: Process and Processors" (PDF). Valparaiso University Law Review. 22 (3): 493–556. Archived from the original (PDF) on 2023-09-28.
- Johnstone, Quintin (Winter 1990). "Major Issues in Real Property Law". Missouri Law Review. 55 (1): 1–41.
- Johnstone, Quintin (1992). "Lawyer Obligations to Moderate-Income Persons" (PDF). Capital University Law Review. 21: 845–859. Archived from the original (PDF) on 2023-07-04.
- Johnstone, Quintin (1996). "Bar Associations: Policies and Performances". Yale Law & Policy Review. 15 (1): 193–243. JSTOR 40239480.
- Johnstone, Quintin (January 2000). "New York State Courts: Their Structure, Administration and Reform Possibilities". New York Law School Law Review. 43 (3): 915–973.
- Johnstone, Quintin (Fall 2001). "The Hartford Community Court: An Experiment That Has Succeeded" (PDF). Connecticut Law Review. 34 (1): 123–156. Archived from the original (PDF) on 2023-07-05.
- Johnstone, Quintin (Summer 2003). "Unauthorized Practice of Law and the Power of State Courts: Difficult Problems and Their Resolution" (PDF). Willamette Law Review. 39 (3): 795–850. Archived from the original (PDF) on 2023-07-05.
- Johnstone, Quintin (Winter 2004). "Connecticut Unauthorized Practice Laws and Some Options for Their Reform" (PDF). Connecticut Law Review. 36 (2): 303–351. Archived from the original (PDF) on 2023-07-04.
- Johnstone, Quintin (2008). "An Overview of the Legal Profession in the United States, How That Profession Recently Has Been Changing, and Its Future Prospects" (PDF). Quinnipiac Law Review. 26 (4): 737–798. Archived from the original (PDF) on 2023-07-05.

=== Reviews ===
- Johnstone, Quintin (1951–1952). "Review of Sex and the Law by Morris Ploscowe" (PDF). University of Kansas City Law Review. 20 (194). University of Kansas City: 194–195. Archived from the original (PDF) on 2023-07-04.
- Johnstone, Quintin (1952–1953). "Review of The Lawyer's Investment Manual by Kenneth Redden and Alexander V. Thelen" (PDF). Kansas Law Review. 1: 235–236.
- Johnstone, Quintin (April 1956). "Review of Politics, Planning, and the Public Interest: The Case of Public Housing in Chicago by Martin Meyerson, Edward C. Banfield" (PDF). Yale Law Journal. 65 (5): 755–758. doi:10.2307/794160. JSTOR 794160. Archived from the original (PDF) on 2023-07-05.
- Johnstone, Quintin (Summer 1957). "Review of Family Cases in Court by Maxine Boord Virtue". University of Chicago Law Review. 24 (4): 798–800. doi:10.2307/1598279. JSTOR 1598279.
