= Adesegun Akin-Olugbade =

Nigerian lawyer (born 1962)

- Citizenship: Nigerian
- Education: Nigerian Law School; King’s College London; Harvard Law School
- Occupation: lawyer
- Honours: Officer of the Order of the Niger

Adesegun Akin-Olugbade (born 4 November 1962) is a Nigerian lawyer and finance executive.

== Early life and education ==
Akin-Olugbade studied law at King’s College London, where he earned an LL.B (Hons) and LL.M. He later obtained an LL.M and SJD from Harvard Law School in 1991. He completed further executive education programs at institutions including International Institute for Management Development (IMD), Wharton CEO Academy, and HEC Montreal. He was a recipient of the Judge Taslim Elias Prize and was the Best Overall Student at the Nigerian Law School in 1984 and admitted to the Nigerian Bar Association that same year.

== Career ==
Akin-Olugbade began his career at Nigeria’s Federal Ministry of Justice as State Counsel. In 1991, he joined the African Development Bank (AfDB). While at AfDB, he was seconded to the African Export-Import Bank as its founding Chief Legal Officer. He later served as the General Counsel and Senior Director at the AfDB until 2011. During his tenure at the AfDB, he played a role in the establishment of the African Legal Support Facility (ALSF). He was an Executive Director, General Counsel, and Corporate Secretary of the Africa Finance Corporation (AFC) and a Non-executive Director of Ecobank Group from 2014 to 2017.

He is the founder and Principal Partner of Luwaji Nominees. He holds advisory roles at international law firms including Aelex Legal and Of Counsel, he is a member of the International Monetary Law Committee of the International Law Association (MOCOMILA) and a patron of the International Law Association, Nigeria Branch (ILA-NG). In July 2025, he was appointed Chairman of the Nigerian Independent System Operator (NISO) by President Bola Tinubu.

== Awards and recognition ==
In 2012, Akin-Olugbade was conferred the title of Officer of the Order of the Niger by the Nigerian government. In 2019, he became the first African member of the World Trade Board. He is also a life member of the Nigerian Conservation Foundation.
