= Katherine Franke =

American legal scholar

Academic background
- Education: Barnard College (BA); Northeastern University (JD); Yale University (LLM, SJD)

Academic work
- Discipline: Gender and sexuality law
- Institutions: Columbia Law School

Katherine M. Franke is an American legal scholar who specializes in gender and sexuality law.

She began her legal career as a civil right litigator, then worked at the New York City Commission on Human Rights as a supervising attorney before becoming an executive director of the National Lawyers Guild. Franke also taught at the University of Arizona, followed by Fordham University School of Law before joining the faculty of Columbia Law School where she was the James L. Dohr Professor of Law at Columbia Law School.

In January 2024, during the Gaza War and the related student protests, Franke raised concerns about Israeli students coming to Columbia “right out of their military service” in response to an incident on campus. Following an external investigation, in January 2025, Franke said she had been effectively terminated from Columbia although the university characterized it as retirement.

== Education ==
Franke received a B.A. from Barnard College in 1981. She graduated from Northeastern University School of Law in 1986. She received an LL.M. and S.J.D. from Yale Law School in 1993 and 1999, respectively.

== Career ==
Franke began practicing law in the 1980s as a civil rights litigator, having received a grant from the MacArthur Foundation to work on addressing social discrimination faced by people with AIDS. She then joined the New York City Commission on Human Rights as a supervising attorney in its newly created AIDS division. In 1990, Franke was named executive director of the National Lawyers Guild.

Franke began her academic career in 1995 at the James E. Rogers College of Law of the University of Arizona and then taught at Fordham University School of Law from 1997 until 2000, when she joined the Columbia Law faculty.

Franke received a Guggenheim Fellowship in 2011 to carry out research on the costs of winning marriage rights for same sex couples and African Americans during the mid-19th century, and her research was published into the book Wedlocked: The Perils of Marriage Equality (2015).

In 2018, Franke traveled to Israel as part of a 14-member human rights delegation touring Israel and the West Bank. However, she was detained and deported with Israeli authorities accusing her of ties to the Boycott, Divestment and Sanctions movement.

=== Israeli-Palestinian conflict ===
In October 2023, following the start of the Gaza War, Franke co-authored an open letter, signed by more than 150 Columbia faculty, entitled "in defense of robust debate about the history and meaning of the war in Israel/Gaza", which was later criticized in a subsequent letter signed by 300 other Columbia faculty members.

In January 2024, an odiferous, possibly hazardous, substance was released at pro-Palestinian students at university on the Columbia University campus. One of the students suspended in connection with the incident was identified as a former member of the Israel Defense Forces (IDF). In a subsequent interview with Democracy Now!, Franke said many Israeli students coming straight from military service were known to harass Palestinian and other students.

In December, during a Congressional hearing on antisemitism, Republican Congresswoman Elise Stefanik quoted Franke as saying that 'all Israeli students who have served in the IDF are dangerous and shouldn't be on campus'. Stefanik sources conceded that the Congresswoman had paraphrased a source which had paraphrased another source.

Following this, Franke received violent threats and claimed people, posing as students, enrolled in her classes to provoke discussions and secretly videotaped her.

In November, an external review concluded that Franke had violated university policies and, in January 2025, Franke announced her retirement from Columbia. Her firing was criticised by activists, academics, the Center for Constitutional Rights, and the UN special rapporteur on the occupied Palestinian territories, Francesca Albanese.

== Personal life ==
Franke is out and has spoken on her experiences as a member of the gay community in the 1980s and 1990s, and on being one of few out lesbian professors earlier in her career.
