= Ya-Wen Lei =

Taiwanese sociologist and legal scholar

- Born: Taipei, Taiwan
- Education: National Taiwan University (LLB); Yale University (LLM, JSD); University of Michigan (MA, PhD)
- Scientific career
- Fields: Sociology
- Workplaces: Harvard University
- Theses: Twin Challenges to Legitimacy (2011); Uncovering the Roots of the Nationwide Counterpublic Sphere in China (2013)

Ya-Wen Lei (Chinese: 雷雅雯; pinyin: Léi Yǎwén; Wade–Giles: Lei² Ya³-wen²) is a Taiwanese sociologist and legal scholar. She is a professor of sociology at Harvard University, where she is also an affiliate of the Fairbank Center for Chinese Studies and the Weatherhead Center for International Affairs.

== Early life and education ==
Lei was born and raised in Taipei, Taiwan. She graduated first in her class from National Taiwan University with an LL.B. in law and economics in 2004, then earned an LL.M. from Yale Law School in 2006 and an M.A. in sociology from the University of Michigan in 2009. In 2011, she earned her Doctor of Juridical Science (J.S.D.) from Yale Law School. Her doctoral dissertation was titled, "Twin Challenges to Legitimacy: China’s Informal Handset Industry Economy in the Globalized Knowledge and Information Economy".

In 2013, Lei earned a second doctorate, a Ph.D. in sociology, from the University of Michigan. Her doctoral dissertation at Michigan, completed under sociologists Greta Krippner, Mark Mizruchi, Yu Xie, Mary Gallagher, and Margaret R. Somers was titled, "Uncovering the Roots of the Nationwide Counterpublic Sphere in China". The thesis won the 2014 American Sociological Association Dissertation Award.

== Academic career ==
After receiving her doctorate in sociology, Lei was a junior fellow at the Harvard Society of Fellows from 2013 to 2016, then became an assistant professor of sociology at the Harvard Faculty of Arts and Sciences in July 2016. From 2018 to 2019, she was a visiting scholar at Sciences Po. She was promoted to an associate professorship at Harvard in July 2020 and was named a full professor of sociology at Harvard in July 2023.

Lei researches political sociology, economic sociology, sociology of work and labor, science and technology studies, law and society, sociology of media and information technologies, development, and Chinese studies.

== Selected publications ==
=== Books ===
- Lei, Ya-Wen (2023-11-21). The Gilded Cage: Technology, Development, and State Capitalism in China. Princeton University Press. ISBN 978-0-691-24925-4.
- Lei, Ya-Wen (2017-11-14). The Contentious Public Sphere: Law, Media, and Authoritarian Rule in China. Princeton University Press. ISBN 978-1-4008-8794-1.

=== Articles ===
- Lei, Ya-Wen; Kim, Rachel (2024-08-12). "Automation and Augmentation: Artificial Intelligence, Robots, and Work". Annual Review of Sociology. 50: 251–272. doi:10.1146/annurev-soc-090523-050708. ISSN 0360-0572.
- Lei, Ya-Wen. "Delivering solidarity: Platform architecture and collective contention in China’s platform economy." American sociological review 86.2 (2021): 279-309.
- Lei, Ya-Wen. "Freeing the press: How field environment explains critical news reporting in China." American Journal of Sociology 122.1 (2016): 1-48.
