= Wilber G. Katz =

American legal scholar

- Born: 1902
- Died: May 17, 1979 (aged 76–77)
- Education: University of Wisconsin (A.B.); Harvard Law School (LL.D., S.J.D.)
- Organization(s): University of Chicago Law School, University of Wisconsin
- Known for: Constitutional law and corporate law

Wilber G. Katz (1902 – May 17, 1979) was an American legal scholar. He served as the 4th dean of the University of Chicago Law School from 1939 to 1950 and later as a professor of law at the University of Wisconsin Law School. He was a leading scholar on constitutional law and religious freedom.

== Education ==
Katz graduated from the University of Wisconsin with an A.B. in 1923. He was a member of Phi Beta Kappa. In 1926, he received an LL.B. from Harvard Law School, where he served as a note editor of the Harvard Law Review. After graduating from law school, he practiced for two years as an attorney in New York with the firm of Root, Clark, Buckner & Ballantine. He left practice to complete his doctorate at Harvard, earning an S.J.D. in 1930. At Harvard, Katz and then professor Felix Frankfurter edited a casebook on federal jurisdiction and procedure. According to former attorney general Edward H. Levi, Frankfurter brought Katz to the attention of the president of the University of Chicago at the time, Robert Maynard Hutchins.

== Career ==
Katz began his teaching career at the University of Chicago Law School in 1930. He was recruited by the law school in an attempt to foster the interdisciplinary approach to legal education for which Chicago had been renowned. The law school had intended for Katz, along with scholar Charles O. Gregory and then professor at Yale Law School, William O. Douglas, to teach various courses in corporate law in the midst of the Great Depression. Although Douglas decided to stay at Yale, the teaching programme continued with the assistance of Katz and Gregory. Katz was a key figure in the establishment of the University of Chicago Law Review in 1933. In 1939, Katz was appointed dean of the law school. He faced issues such as a decline in enrollment and the departure of staff during the Second World War and the appropriation of buildings to support the war effort. Katz taught corporate law, constitutional law, and the law of religious freedom, on which he published widely. Paul G. Kauper, a professor at the University of Michigan Law School, observed the following about Katz's scholarship in this area:

In his writings on the subject he has revealed insights and developed a canon of constitutional interpretation which have earned him a position of preeminent mentor ... A rich scholarship, penetrating analysis and insights, and mature reflection coupled with grace in writing, sensitivity to underlying values, a sense of intellectual integrity, respect for the views of others, and a kindly humor have all contributed to the effectiveness with which he has presented his views.

In 1945, the U.S. Supreme Court appointed Katz to represent two prisoners seeking review of a decision of the Supreme Court of Illinois denying them leave to file petitions of habeas corpus. Katz's clients were unsuccessful, but the case highlighted problems with the procedure in the state's criminal laws, prompting Katz to pen an open letter to the Illinois Attorney General castigating his role in perpetuating these problems. The letter was published in the University of Chicago Law Review.

After more than thirty years at Chicago, Katz joined the University of Wisconsin Law School in 1962. He retired from full-time teaching in 1970 but continued to teach part-time until his death on May 17, 1979.
