= Doctor of Juridical Science =

Terminal research doctoral degree in law

A Doctor of Juridical Science (SJD; Latin: Scientiae Juridicae Doctor), or a Doctor of the Science of Law (JSD; Latin: Juridicae Scientiae Doctor)_{,} is a terminal research doctorate in law that is equivalent to a Ph.D. degree. In most countries, it is the most advanced law degree that can be earned, higher than the Master of Laws (LL.M.), Juris Doctor (J.D.), and Bachelor of Laws (LL.B.).

== Australia ==
The SJD is offered by the Australian National University, Bond University, La Trobe University, the University of Canberra, the University of New South Wales, the University of Technology Sydney, and the University of Western Australia.

The University of Sydney stopped accepting new applications for an SJD in 2018.

== Canada ==
In Canada, the JSD or SJD is offered solely at the University of Toronto Faculty of Law. Other law schools in Canada offer a PhD in law, Doctor of Laws or Doctor of Civil Law degree as the terminal degree.

== Italy ==
In Italy, the title of Doctor of Juridical Science (dottore in scienze giuridiche) is awarded to holders of a Degree in Juridical Sciences (laurea in scienze giuridiche, EQF level 6), while Magistral Doctor of Juridical Sciences (dottore magistrale in scienze giuridiche) is awarded to holders of a Magistral Degree in Juridical Sciences (laurea magistrale in scienze giuridiche, EQF level 7).

Instead, the terminal degree for law, is the research doctorate (PhD, dottorato di ricerca), awarding the title of Research Doctor (dottore di ricerca).

== United States ==
The JSD, or SJD, is a research doctorate, and as such, in contrast to the JD, it is equivalent to the more commonly awarded research doctorate, the PhD.

In 1910, Harvard Law School became the first American law school to offer the SJD/JSD. The first student to obtain a Doctor of Juridical Science was Eldon Revare James, who entered Harvard in 1911, and obtained his SJD in 1912. Other law schools, including Cornell, Yale, NYU, Michigan, and Columbia, followed suit. Between 1910 and World War II, most law students who earned the SJD/JSD in the United States were Americans preparing to become law professors. However, after World War II, the SJD/JSD fell out of popularity with American law students, but became increasingly more attractive to foreign students seeking proficiency in American law. For example, in the 1950s, 155 American students earned the SJD/JSD, 110 Americans earned it in the 1960s, and only 65 Americans received the degree in the 1970s. But foreign law students earned two-thirds of the American SJD/JSDs in the 1970s. In the 1980s, only 25% of American SJD/JSDs were awarded to American law students. Today, American scholars rarely earn the SJD/JSD. Most scholars who complete the JSD/SJD at American universities are international students seeking employment in their home countries. Many foreign SJD/JSD students are already lawyers in their home countries, and are seeking to further advance their careers.

Applicants for the program must have outstanding academic credentials. A professional degree in law (such as a JD) is required, as well as an LLM. Exceptions as to the latter condition (i.e., holding an LLM) are rarely granted.

The JSD/SJD typically requires three to five years to complete. The program begins with a combination of required and elective coursework. Then, upon passage of the oral exam, the student advances to doctoral candidacy. Completion of the program requires a dissertation, which serves as an original contribution to the scholarly field of law.

== Notable recipients ==
Notable recipients of the degree of Doctor of Juridical Science include:

- Shirley Abrahamson (University of Wisconsin, 1962), Chief Justice of the Wisconsin Supreme Court
- Lama Abu-Odeh
- Jeffrey Addicott
- Adesegun Akin-Olugbade
- Janet Albrechtsen
- Ann Aldrich
- Helena Alviar Garcia
- Jeanine Áñez
- Antony Anghie
- Robert Araujo
- Morris S. Arnold
- S. K. B. Asante
- Mohammad Ali Asfanani
- Florence Ashley
- Dionysia-Theodora Avgerinopoulou (Columbia, 2011), member of the Hellenic Parliament
- Ronen Avraham
- Artur Baghdasaryan
- Baik Tae-ung
- Bajrakitiyabha (Cornell, 2005), Thai princess
- Daphne Barak-Erez
- Upendra Baxi
- Lucian Bebchuk (Harvard, 1984), Professor, Harvard Law School.
- Larissa Behrendt (Harvard, 1998), Australian legal academic, writer, filmmaker and Indigenous rights advocate.
- Myma Belo-Osagie
- David Bennett (barrister)
- Eyal Benvenisti
- Joaquin Bernas
- Mark Berry (lawyer)
- Daniil Bessarabov, member of the Russian State Duma
- Gerry W. Beyer
- Leora Bilsky
- Daniel Boorstin (Yale, 1940), American historian
- Willard L. Boyd
- Anu Bradford
- Geraldo Brindeiro
- Russell Brown (judge)
- Nolly C. Buco
- Thomas Buergenthal
- Mortimer Caplin
- Jorge Carpizo McGregor
- Jo Carrillo
- Rene Cayetano
- Dhananjaya Y. Chandrachud (Harvard, 1986), The Chief Justice of the Supreme Court of India
- Chang Tien-chin
- Chang Wen-chen
- Chao Shou-po
- Hilary Charlesworth
- Chen Changwen
- Chen Chun-han
- Chen Lung-chu
- Chen Shih-yung
- Chiang Wan-an
- Hungdah Chiu
- Cho Kuk
- George C. Christie
- Benjamin V. Cohen
- Gilberto Concepción de Gracia
- Thomas Gardiner Corcoran
- Joseph Dainow
- Edward J. Damich
- Zhou Dan
- Ted de Boer
- Rangita de Silva de Alwis
- Miriam Defensor Santiago (Michigan, 1976), Senator of the Philippines and Judge of the International Criminal Court
- Rodolfo Delgado (lawyer)
- Paul Demaret
- Francis Deng (Yale, 1968), South Sudanese diplomat
- Markus U. Diethelm
- Ethel Frances Donaghue
- Nabil Elaraby
- María Elósegui
- Michael Fakhri
- Richard A. Falk
- John T. Fey
- Liana Fiol Matta
- Edith Fisch
- Thomas Fitzpatrick
- Henry H. Fowler (Yale, 1933), United States Secretary of the Treasury
- Thomas M. Franck
- Katherine Franke (Yale Law School, 1998), Professor, Columbia Law School
- Jody Freeman
- Paul A. Freund
- Fu Kun-cheng
- Zvi Gabbay
- Samuel García (politician)
- Manuel García-Mansilla
- Markus Gehring
- Ernest W. Gibson Jr.
- Joseph Gold (lawyer)
- Michele Goodwin
- Erwin Griswold (Harvard, 1929), United States Solicitor General
- Simona Grossi
- Ofer Grosskopf
- Ruth Halperin-Kaddari
- George Chaponda
- Henry M. Hart Jr.
- Adila Hassim
- William H. Hastie (Harvard, 1933), first African-American United States federal judge
- James C. Hathaway
- A. Andrew Hauk
- John N. Hazard
- He Jiahong
- Gail E. Henderson
- Rosalyn Higgins (Yale, 1962), English judge and president of the International Court of Justice
- Joseph R. Houchins
- Charles Hamilton Houston (Harvard, 1923), prominent civil rights attorney
- Huang Kuo-chang
- Huang Kuo-chung
- Manley Ottmer Hudson
- Susan Hurley
- Hwang Jau-yuan
- Feisal al-Istrabadi
- Yuji Iwasawa
- Bruce Jacob (Harvard, 1980), Dean of Stetson University College of Law, counsel in Gideon v. Wainwright
- Kristine Jarinovska
- George Marion Johnson
- Quintin Johnstone
- Wang Junfeng
- Simon Kagugube
- Kao Su-po
- Wilber G. Katz
- Nir Kedar
- W. Page Keeton
- Robert Keeton
- David Kershaw
- Vikramaditya Khanna
- Spencer L. Kimball
- Winifred Kiryabwire
- Esther Mayambala Kisaakye
- Juliane Kokott
- Stretch Kontelj
- Oleg Krassov
- C. Raj Kumar
- Tony La Viña
- Wayne LaFave
- Lai In-jaw
- Lai In-jaw (Harvard, 1981), former President of the Judicial Yuan (Chief Justice of the Constitutional Court) of the Republic of China
- I. Beverly Lake Sr.
- Jose P. Laurel (Yale, 1920), President of the Philippines
- Salvador Laurel (Yale, 1960), Vice President of the Philippines, Prime Minister of the Philippines
- Lauritz Lauritzen
- Robert Leckey
- Robert A. Leflar (Harvard, 1932), law school dean, Arkansas Supreme Court justice
- Ya-Wen Lei
- Pierre Lellouche
- Gillian Lester
- Priscilla Leung
- Edward H. Levi (Yale, 1938) President of University of Chicago, US Attorney General
- Li Gui-min
- Liang Su-yung
- Lo Chang-fa
- Orly Lobel
- Ricardo Lorenzetti
- Allen Loughry
- Alexander Lowen
- Witalis Ludwiczak
- Ma Ying-jeou (Harvard, 1980), former President of the Republic of China (Taiwan)
- Mark MacGuigan (Columbia, 1961), member of the House of Commons of Canada
- Kiddu Makubuya
- Henry Manne (Yale, 1966), law professor, one of the founders of the discipline of Law and economics
- John J. Marchi
- Bessie Margolin
- Sheilah Martin
- Maung Maung
- Menachem Mautner
- Myres S. McDougal
- Timothy McEvoy
- Dmitry Medvedev
- Thomas Mensah (lawyer)
- Theodor Meron (Harvard, 1957), professor of law (New York University School of Law) and president of the International Criminal Tribunal for the Former Yugoslavia
- John Henry Merryman
- Aguedo Mojica
- Michael S. Moore (academic) (Harvard, 1978), legal philosopher, professor at University of Illinois College of Law
- Mayo Moran
- Joseph Wilson Morris (University of Michigan, 1955), dean of the University of Tulsa College of Law, United States federal judge
- Wayne Morse (Columbia, 1932), United States Senator from Oregon
- Mohamed Munavvar
- Porfirio Muñoz Ledo
- Sean D. Murphy
- Pauli Murray (Yale, 1965), prominent civil rights advocate
- Peter Mutharika (Yale, 1969), president of the Republic of Malawi
- Makau Mutua
- Zahara Nampewo
- Frank C. Newman
- Russell D. Niles (Yale, 1931), Dean of New York Universit School of Law
- Charles H. Norchi
- Daniel Nsereko
- Marcelo Nubla
- Shigeru Oda (Yale, 1953), Japanese judge for the International Court of Justice
- Ruth Okediji
- Christian Nwachukwu Okeke
- Covey T. Oliver
- Joe Oloka-Onyango
- Frances Olsen
- Cheluchi Onyemelukwe
- Vjosa Osmani
- Abdullah Al-Ouda
- Vladimir Ovchinsky
- Matthew Palmer
- Petre Pandrea
- Paul Paton (legal scholar)
- Natalia Petkevich
- Andrew Phang (Harvard, 1987), Judge of Appeal, Supreme Court of Singapore
- Alexandra Phelan
- James A. Pike (Yale, 1938), Episcopal bishop
- Navanethem Pillay (Harvard, 1988), UN High Commissioner for Human Rights
- Norma Lucía Piña Hernández
- L. Welch Pogue (Harvard, 1927), Chairman of the Civil Aeronautics Board
- Robert Pozen (Yale, 1973), vice chairman and president of Fidelity Investments
- Jerome Prince (legal scholar)
- Ayala Procaccia
- Ayala Procaccia (University of Pennsylvania, 1972), Israel Supreme Court Justice
- Radoslav Procházka
- Reynato Puno
- Asifa Quraishi
- Ken Randall (legal scholar)
- Zbigniew Rau
- Edward D. Re
- John W. Reed (Columbia, 1957), Dean of the University of Colorado Law School
- Uriel Reichman
- Charles E. Rice
- Ivor Richardson
- Willis William Ritter
- Christos Rozakis (University of Illinois, 1973) President of the Administrative Tribunal of the Council of Europe and former vice-president of the European Court of Human Rights
- Jovito Salonga (Yale, 1949), President of the Senate of the Philippines
- Lobsang Sangay (Harvard, 2004), former President of the Central Tibetan Administration and professor of law at Harvard University
- Rick Sarre
- Surakiart Sathirathai
- Akilagpa Sawyerr
- Francis Bowes Sayre Sr.
- Lisa M. Schenck
- Derek Schmidt (University of Kansas, 2015), United States Representative from Kansas
- Robert E. Scott
- Anja Seibert-Fohr
- Stephen M. Sheppard
- Edward F. Sherman
- Harry Shulman
- Morris C. Shumiatcher
- Rodney K. Smith
- Allan F. Smith, Dean of the University of Michigan Law School
- Joseph Tyree Sneed III
- Louis B. Sohn
- Song Sang-hyun (Cornell Law School, 1970), President of the International Criminal Court (ICC)
- Sven Spengemann
- Norman St John-Stevas
- Harold Montelle Stephens
- Julius Stone
- Rennard Strickland, law professor, Dean, President of the Association of American Law Schools
- Wesley Alba Sturges, Dean of Yale Law School
- Su Chiao-hui
- Khadicha Sulaimanova
- Nimer Sultany
- Clyde Summers
- Symeon C. Symeonides (Harvard, 1980), Dean of Willamette University College of Law
- Lulzim Tafa
- Brian Z. Tamanaha
- Heath Tarbert
- Henri Temple
- Jacobus tenBroek
- Seymour R. Thaler
- Gedion Timothewos
- Neelan Tiruchelvam
- Mathew Tobriner
- John S. D. Tory
- Walter Emanuel Treanor
- George Triantis
- José Trías Monge
- Alter Tsypkin
- Ksenija Turković
- Robert F. Turner (University of Virginia, 1996), law professor, first president of the United States Institute of Peace
- Roberto Mangabeira Unger
- Dimitar Vachov
- Paul R. Verkuil (New York University, 1972), president of the American Automobile Association
- Alexander Vershinin
- Stephen Waddams
- Wang Yu-chi
- Mastin Gentry White (Harvard, 1933), Judge on the United States Court of Federal Claims
- Norman Adrian Wiggins
- Luzius Wildhaber
- Ernest L. Wilkinson
- Hassan Wirajuda
- Wissanu Krea-ngam
- Eric Wu
- Xue Hanqin (Columbia, 1995), U.N. International Court of Justice judge
- Peter Tuen-Ho Yang
- Yeh Jiunn-rong
- A. N. Yiannopoulos
- Levi Ying
- Arturo Zaldívar Lelo de Larrea
- Bernard Zylstra

== See also ==
- Doctor of Law
- Legum Doctor (Doctor of Laws; LLD)
- Juris Doctor (JD)
- Master of Laws (LLM)
- Bachelor of Laws (LLB)
- Doctor of Canon Law, Catholic Church (JCD)
