= Gerry W. Beyer =

American lawyer, academic and author

- Occupations: Lawyer, academic, and author

Academic background
- Education: B.A., summa cum laude J.D., summa cum laude LL.M. J.S.D.
- Alma mater: Eastern Michigan University; Ohio State University; University of Illinois

Gerry W. Beyer is an American lawyer, academic, and author. He is the Governor Preston E. Smith Regents Professor of Law at Texas Tech University School of Law.

Beyer is most known for his work in estate planning, trusts, wills, and related fields. He has authored over 25 books, including Wills, Trusts, and Estates: Examples & Explanations, Teaching Materials on Estate Planning, and Texas Law of Wills. His work has received honors, including three Excellence in Writing Awards from the American Bar Association. Moreover, he is the recipient of distinguished faculty awards from three law schools, including the Texas Tech's Chancellor's Distinguished Teaching Award, the 2015 President's Academic Achievement Award, and the Outstanding Law Researcher Award in 2013 and 2017.

== Education ==
Beyer earned his Bachelor of Arts from Eastern Michigan University in 1976. He received his Juris Doctor from the Ohio State University in 1979 and was inducted into the Order of the Coif, followed by a Master of Laws from the University of Illinois in 1983. Later, he completed his Doctor of the Science of Law at the University of Illinois in 1990.

== Career ==
After practicing law with the Columbus, Ohio law firm of Knisley, Carpenter, Wilhelm, and Nein, Beyer began his academic career as a law instructor at the University of Illinois between 1980 and 1981. He then joined St. Mary's University in 1981 as an assistant professor of law and was promoted to associate professor in 1984. From 1987 to 2005, he served as a professor of law at St. Mary's University. In 2005, he joined the faculty of the Texas Tech University School of Law as the first holder of the Governor Preston E. Smith Regents Professor of Law, a position which he currently holds.

Beyer was inducted into the Estate Planning Hall of Fame by the National Association of Estate Planners & Councils in 2015 for his contributions to the field and later received the Distinguished Probate Attorney Lifetime Achievement Award from the Real Estate, Probate, and Trust Law Section of the State Bar of Texas in 2022.

Beyer is the editor of the Wills, Trusts, and Estates Prof Blog, which earned Hall of Fame status in 2015 after being named to the ABA Journal's Blawg 100 for five consecutive years. He also has served as editor-in-chief of the REPTL Reporter, the official journal of the Real Estate, Probate and Trust Law Section of the State Bar of Texas, since 2014.

Beyer was treasurer of the Lubbock County Bar Association from 2009 to 2010 and served on the Real Estate, Probate, and Trust Law Council of the State Bar of Texas from 2009 to 2013. Furthermore, he contributed to the Texas Law Component for the Texas Board of Law Examiners. He was also a member of the Estate Planning and Probate Law Exam Commission from 1991 to 2005 and has served as the keeping current probate editor for Probate & Property magazine since 1992. He served as a president of the South Plains Trust & Estate Council from 2010 to 2011 and has been one of its directors since 2007.

Beyer is a member of an Academic Fellow and former Regent of the American College of Trust and Estate Counsel, and a member of the American Law Institute. Additionally, he was appointed by the Uniform Law Commission as the Reporter for the Uniform Electronic Estate Planning Documents Act in 2021 and the Probate and Non-Probate Transfer Integration Study Committee in 2023.

Beyer is a frequent lecturer. He has presented 'continuing legal education' presentations for national, state, and local bar associations, universities, and civic groups.

== Research ==
Beyer ranks among the top 0.001% of law authors on the Social Science Research Network (SSRN). He has authored books and articles on various aspects of estate planning, including a two-volume treatise on Texas wills law, a law school casebook on estate planning, and the Wills, Trusts, and Estates volume in the Examples & Explanations series. His writings have earned him four awards from the American Bar Association's Probate & Property magazine.

Beyer researches estate planning, focusing on trusts, wills, and strategies to identify and mitigate will contest risks with tailored approaches, while also addressing malpractice liabilities and ethical challenges, guiding practitioners on how to avoid pitfalls and protect client intent. In a collaborative work, he critiqued post-mortem probate, which could lead to will contests, and advocated for ante-mortem probate as a more effective alternative, reviewing existing models and arguing for its adoption to protect testators' intentions.

Focusing on the legal profession's reliance on technology, Beyer discusses how this shift reshapes estate planning through the rise of cryptocurrency, the development of electronic wills, the importance of managing digital assets like cryptocurrency and NFTs, and the prudent use of Artificial Intelligence. He highlights strategies to address virtual currency challenges, reviews he Uniform Electronic Wills Act and state law variations, and provides practical tools for implementing the Revised Uniform Fiduciary Access to Digital Assets Act in his work, "Cyber Estate Planning and Administration."

Beyer led efforts to help people plan for their companion animals as well, serving on the advisory board for 2nd Chance for Pets and the Animal Research Committee at The Southwest Foundation, emphasizing short- and long-term care provisions, legal variations across U.S. jurisdictions, and key estate planning techniques for pet owners.

== Selected awards and honors ==
- 1988 – Distinguished Faculty Award, St. Mary's University Alumni Association
- 2000 – Russell W. Galloway Professor of the Year Award, Santa Clara University
- 2010-2011 – Chancellor's Distinguished Teaching Award, Texas Tech University
- 2012-2013 – Advanced Professor of the Year, Texas Tech University
- 2015 – President's Academic Achievement Award, Texas Tech University
- 2015 – Estate Planning Hall of Fame, National Association of Estate Planners & Councils
- 2017 – The Outstanding (Law) Researcher Award, Texas Tech University
- 2022 – Hess Memorial Lecturer, New York City Bar
- 2022 – Distinguished Probate Attorney Lifetime Achievement Award, Real Estate, Probate, and Trust Law Section of State Bar of Texas
- 2023 – Professor of the Year, Criminal Law Association, Texas Tech University School of Law
- 2025 – Hall of Fame (Career/Academic Accomplishments), Grand Haven High School (Michigan)

== Bibliography ==
=== Selected books ===
- Fat Cats and Lucky Dogs (2010) (co-authored with Barry Seltzer) ISBN 9780966431353
- Texas Wills, Trusts, and Estates (2018) ISBN 9781531005757
- Modern Dictionary for the Legal Profession (2021) ISBN 9780837741727
- Wills, Trusts, and Estates – Examples & Explanations (8th ed. 2022) ISBN 9781543846829
- Texas Estate Planning Statutes with Commentary: 2023-2025 Edition (2023) ISBN 9798823013390
- Teaching Materials on Estate Planning (5th ed. 2023) ISBN 9781684676828
- Beyer's Texas Property Code Annotated (2024) ISBN 9781668782545
- Texas Law of Wills, 4th, 2024-2025 Edition (2024) ISBN 9798350283853

=== Selected articles ===
- Beyer, G. W. (1983). Videotaping the Will Execution Ceremony-Preventing Frustration of the Testator's Final Wishes. Mary's LJ, 15, 1.
- Beyer, G. W. (1993). Statutory Fill-in-Will Forms-The First Decade: Theoretical Constructs and Empirical Findings. Or. L. Rev., 72, 769.
- Beyer, G. W., Dickinson, R. G., & Wake, K. L. (1997). The Fine Art of Intimidating Disgruntled Beneficiaries with In Terrorem Clauses. SMUL Rev., 51, 225.
- Beyer, G. W. (2000). Pet Animals: What Happens When Their Humans Die. Santa Clara L. Rev., 40, 617.
- Beyer, G. W., & Wilkerson, J. P. (2008). Max's Taxes: A Tax-Based Analysis of Pet Trusts. U. Rich. L. Rev., 43, 1219.
- Beyer, G. W., & Cahn, N. (2013). Digital planning: the future of elder law. NAELA J., 9, 135.
- Beyer, G. W., & Dacus, B. (2016). Puff, The Magic Dragon, and the Estate Planner. Tex. A&M J. Prop. L., 3, 1.
- Beyer, G. W. (2020). A Safe Harbor in the Medicaid Adventure: Lady Bird and Transfer on Death Deeds. ACTEC LJ, 46, 3.
- Beyer, G. W., & Nipp, K. (2023). Estate Planning for Cyber Property-Electronic Communications, Cryptocurrency, Non-Fungible Tokens, and the Metaverse. Est. Plan. & Cmty. Prop. LJ, 16, 1.
