= James C. Hathaway =

James Hathaway CM
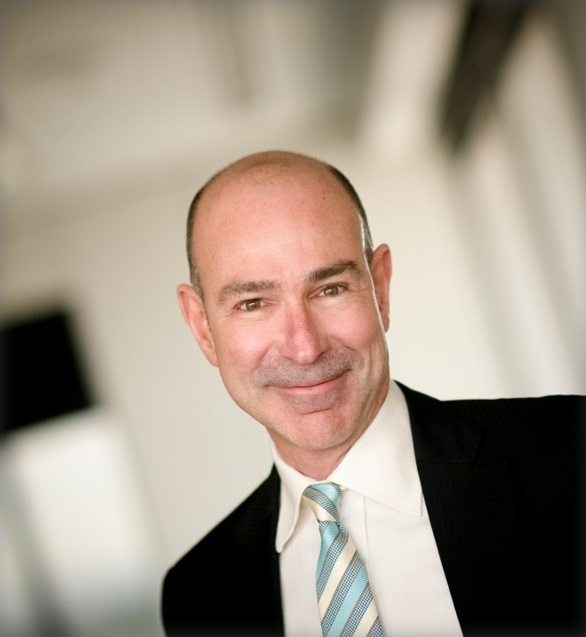
- Born: 1956 (age 69–70); Canada

Academic background
- Education: McGill University; York University (LLB); Columbia University (LLM, SJD)

Academic work
- Discipline: refugee law
- School or tradition: refugee law
- Institutions: University of Michigan

James C. Hathaway (born 1956) is a Canadian and American scholar of international refugee law and related aspects of human rights and public international law. His work has been frequently cited by the most senior courts of the common law world, and has played a pivotal role in the evolution of refugee studies scholarship. Hathaway pioneered the understanding of refugee status as surrogate or substitute protection of human rights, authored the world's first comprehensive analysis of the human rights of refugees, merging doctrinal study of refugee and human rights law with empirical analysis of the state of refugee protection around the world and directed a groundbreaking multidisciplinary and global team of scholars and officials in an initiative to reconceive the structures of refugee protection more fairly to share burdens and responsibilities. Hathaway also convened the Michigan Colloquium on Challenges in International Refugee Law, which met eight times between 1999 and 2017 to formulate guidelines to resolve cutting-edge concerns on both refugee status and refugee rights under international law. An archive of Hathaway's scholarly working papers has been established at the University of Michigan's Bentley Historical Library.

Hathaway is the founding editor of Cambridge Asylum and Migration Studies, and served as senior advisor to Asylum Access, a non-profit organization committed to delivering innovative legal aid to refugees in the Global South (2013-2022) and Counsel on International Protection to the United States Committee for Refugees and Immigrants (2008-2022).

== Education ==
Hathaway started his undergraduate education at McGill University from 1974 to 1976, studying international political economy. He then earned his Bachelor of Laws with honours from Osgoode Hall Law School at York University in 1979, followed by his Master of Laws and Doctor of Juridical Science from Columbia Law School in 1982. He was called to the bars of the Canadian provinces of Ontario and New Brunswick. He presently resides in San Francisco and Vancouver.

== Career ==
Hathaway is the Degan Professor of Law Emeritus at the University of Michigan Law School (USA) where he served as the founding Director of the Program in Refugee and Asylum Law (1998-2022).

He has been appointed a visiting professor at the American University in Cairo, and at the Universities of California, Macerata, San Francisco, Stanford, Tokyo, and Toronto. Hathaway was also the Distinguished Visiting professor of International Refugee Law at the University of Amsterdam from 2010 to 2022.

Prior to joining the Michigan faculty, Hathaway served as founding faculty member of the Ecole de droit de l'Université de Moncton (Canada) (1981-1984), the world's first French-language common law program of study, and Professor of Law and Associate Dean of York University's Osgoode Hall Law School (1984-1998).

From 2008 until 2010, Hathaway was on leave from Michigan Law School to serve as the Dean and William Hearn Chair of Law at the Melbourne Law School in Australia. At Melbourne he led the Law School's transition to become Australia's first, all-graduate (JD) program. Hathaway's main focus was to establish Melbourne as Australia's leading law school, including by joining other law schools from around the world to establish the London-based Centre for Transnational Legal Studies, and launching joint degree programs linking Melbourne with leading law schools on three continents, including the Chinese University of Hong Kong (JD/LLM), New York University (JD/JD and JD/LLM) and Oxford University (JD/BCL).

== Scholarship ==
Hathaway's scholarly work focuses on international human rights and refugees.

Among his publications are a treatise on the refugee definition, The Law of Refugee Status: 2nd Edition (with M. Foster) (2014); and an analysis of the nature of the legal duty to protect refugees, The Rights of Refugees under International Law: 2nd Edition (2021); and an interdisciplinary study of refugee law reform, Reconceiving International Refugee Law (1997). He has also published more than 100 journal articles, book chapters, and commentaries on refugee law and related questions.

== Awards ==
- Honorary doctorate from the University of Amsterdam (2017)
- Honorary doctorate from the Université catholique de Louvain, Belgium (2009)
- American Society of International Law Certificate of Merit (2007)
- Member of the Order of Canada (2025)

== Publications ==
- Hathaway, J. 2023. “Claiming Queer Liberty.” Berkeley Journal of International Law 41(1).
- Hathaway, J. 2021. "The Architecture of the UN Refugee Convention and Protocol." In Oxford Handbook of International Refugee Law, edited by Cathryn Costello, Michelle Foster, and Jane McAdam. Oxford: Oxford University Press. Also available at University of Michigan Law School repository.
- Hathaway, J. 2019. "Assigning Protection: Can Refugee Rights and State Preferences be Reconciled?" Journal of Institutional and Theoretical Economics 175, no. 1: 33–45. Also available at University of Michigan Law School repository.
- Hathaway, J. 2018. "The Global Cop-Out on Refugees." International Journal of Refugee Law 30, no. 4: 591–604. Also available at University of Michigan Law School repository.
- Hathaway, J, and T. Gammeltoft-Hansen. 2015. "Non-Refoulement in a World of Cooperative Deterrence". Colum. J. Transnat'l L 235–284.
- Hathaway, J, A. North, and J. Pobjoy. 2013. "Supervising the Refugee Convention". Journal of Refugee Studies 323–330.
- Hathaway, J. and Pobjoy, J. 2011. "Queer Cases Make Bad Law". NYU Journal of International Law and Politics 315–388.
- Hathaway, J. 2010. Leveraging Asylum Texas International Law Journal 45(3): 503–45.
- Hathaway, J. 2008. The human rights quagmire of "human trafficking"' Virginia Journal of International Law 49: 1–59, republished in M. Segrave ed. "Human Trafficking", 2013.
- Hathaway, J. 2007. 'Forced Michigan Studies: Could we Agree Just to 'Date'?' Journal of Refugee Studies 20: 349–369; 385–390.
- Hathaway, J. 2007. 'Why Refugee Law Still Matters' The Melbourne Journal of International Law 8: 89–103.
- Hathaway, J. 2004. "The Right of States to Repatriate Former Refugees". Ohio State Journal on Dispute Resolution 175–216; reprinted in 26 Immigration and Nationality Law Review, 2006.
- Hathaway, J. and W. Hicks, 2004. 'Is there a 'subjective element' in the refugee convention's requirement of 'well-founded fear' Michigan Journal of International Law 26: 505–562.
- Hathaway, J. 2003. 'What's in a Label?' European Journal of Migration and Law 5: 1–21.
- Hathaway, J. and Foster, M. 2003. "Internal Protection/Relocation/Flight Alternative as an Aspect of Refugee Status Determination". E. Feller et al. eds. "Refugee Protection in International Law" 353–420.
- Hathaway J. and C. Harvey, 2001. 'Framing Refugee Protection in the New World Disorder' Cornell International Law Journal 34 257–320.
- Hathaway, J. and A. Cusick. 2000. "Refugee Rights Are Not Negotiable". 14(2) Georgetown Immigration Law Journal 481–539.
- Hathaway, J. 2000. "America, Defender of Democratic Legitimacy?" 11(1) European Journal of International Law 121-134.
- Hathaway, J. and R. Alexander Neve. 1997. "Making International Refugee Law Relevant Again: A Proposal for Collectivized and Solution-Oriented Protection." Harvard Human Rights Journal 10: 115–211. Also available at University of Michigan Law School repository.
- Hathaway, J. 1997. Reconceiving International Refugee Law. Nijhoff Law Specials 30. The Hague, The Netherlands: Martinus Nijhoff Publishers.
- Hathaway, J. 1996. "Fundamental Justice and the Deflection of Refugees From Canada." Osgoode Hall Law Journal 34, no. 2: 213–270. Also available at University of Michigan Law School repository.
- Hathaway, J. 1995. "New Directions to Avoid Hard Problems: The Distortion of the Palliative Role of Refugee Protection." Journal of Refugee Studies 8, no. 3: 288–294.
- Hathaway, J. 1993. "Labelling the 'Boat People': The Failure of the Human Rights Mandate of the Comprehensive Plan of Action for Indochinese Refugees." Human Rights Quarterly 15, no. 4: 686–702.
- Hathaway, J. 1992. "The Emerging Politics of Non-Entree." Refugees, no. 91: 40–41.
- Hathaway, J. 1992. "The Conundrum of Refugee Protection in Canada: From Control to Compliance to Collective Deterrence." Journal of Policy History 4, no. 1: 71–92. Also available at University of Michigan Law School repository.
- Hathaway, J. 1990. "A Reconsideration of the Underlying Premise of Refugee Law." Harvard International Law Journal 31, no. 1: 129–183. Also available at University of Michigan Law School repository.
- Hathaway, J. 1988. "Selective Concern: An Overview of Refugee Law in Canada." McGill Law Journal 33, no. 4: 676–715. Also available at University of Michigan Law School repository.
- Hathaway, J. 1984. "The Evolution of Refugee Status in International Law: 1920-1950." International and Comparative Law Quarterly 33, no. 2: 348–380. Also available at University of Michigan Law School repository.
