= Sean D. Murphy =

American international law scholar

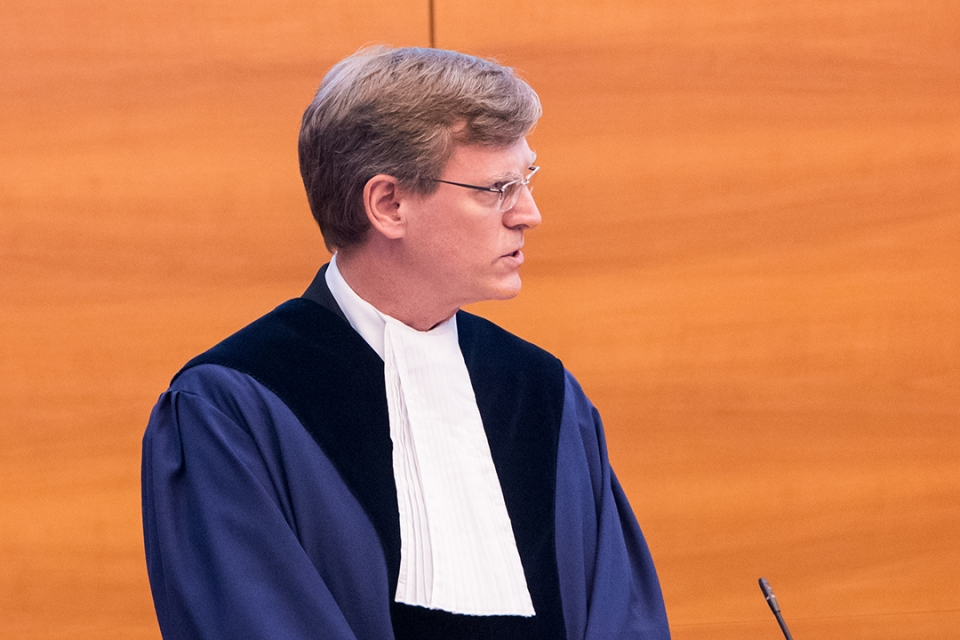
Murphy at the International Tribunal for the Law of the Sea (2019)

Sean David Murphy is an American international law scholar and practitioner currently serving as the Manatt/Ahn Professor of International Law at the George Washington University Law School in Washington, D.C., where he has been teaching since 1998. His primary areas of scholarly research are public international law, foreign affairs and the Constitution of the United States, international organizations, international dispute settlement, and law of the sea. Murphy served for ten years on the Board of Editors of the American Journal of International Law and is a former president of the American Society of International Law. He was elected twice by the United Nations General Assembly to serve as a Member of the U.N. International Law Commission (ILC) during 2012-2022. He was named by the ILC as Special Rapporteur for Crimes Against Humanity, a topic on which he has lectured widely.

Prior to his arrival at George Washington University Law School in 1998, Murphy was the legal counselor at the Embassy of the United States, The Hague from 1995 to 1998; in this position, he argued several cases before the International Court of Justice (ICJ) and represented the U.S. government in matters before the International Criminal Tribunal for the former Yugoslavia. He also served as a staff attorney for the Legal Adviser of the Department of State (1987-1995). From 1985 to 1986, he was a law clerk for Senior Judge Thomas Aquinas Flannery of the United States District Court for the District of Columbia. He is a member of the Maryland bar.

In addition to his academic appointment, he frequently serves as counsel, expert, or arbitrator in various fora, such as in cases before the ICJ; International Centre for the Settlement of Investment Disputes (ICSID) and the Permanent Court of Arbitration; and as ad hoc judge at the International Tribunal for the Law of the Sea. In 2022, Murphy was appointed by the President of the World Bank to chair a Court of Arbitration between Pakistan and India concerning the Indus Waters Treaty. In 2023, he was appointed as an arbitrator for a NAFTA-related dispute brought by the Alberta Petroleum Marketing Commission against the United States concerning the Keystone XL pipeline. In 2024, the U.S. government designated Murphy as one of four U.S. nationals to ICSID's Panel of Arbitrators.

Murphy received his S.J.D. from the University of Virginia School of Law (1995; Ford Foundation Graduate Scholarship and Council on Foreign Relations Fellow), his LL.M. from the University of Cambridge (1987), his J.D. from Columbia Law School (1985; Editor-in-Chief of the Columbia Journal of Transnational Law), and his B.A. (magna cum laude and Phi Beta Kappa) from the Catholic University of America (1982). Murphy has published numerous articles and books on international law and U.S. foreign relations law. He is a Member of the American Law Institute, where he serves as an adviser for the Restatement (Fourth) on the Foreign Relations Law of the United States, and in 2021 was elected as a Member of L'Institute de Droit International.

== Selected works ==
- Murphy, Sean D.; Swaine, Edward T. (2023). The Law of U.S. Foreign Relations. New York: Oxford University Press. ISBN 978-0-19-936197-7.
- Murphy, Sean D.; Buergenthal, Thomas (2019). Public International Law in a Nutshell. St. Paul, MN: West, 6th edition. ISBN 978-1-68328-239-6.
- Murphy, Sean D. (2018). Principles of International Law. St. Paul, MN: West, 3rd edition. ISBN 978-1-68328-677-6.
- Murphy, Sean D. (2017). International Law Relating to Islands. Leiden: Brill Nijhoff. ISBN 978-90-04-36153-9.
- Murphy, Sean D.; Kidane, Won; Snider, Thomas R. (2013). Litigating War: Arbitration of Civil Injury by the Eritrea-Ethiopia Claims Commission. New York, NY: Oxford University Press. ISBN 978-0-19-979372-3.

== Lectures ==
- Crimes against Humanity in the Lecture Series of the United Nations Audiovisual Library of International Law
- Regime of Islands, in the Lecture Series of the United Nations Audiovisual Library of International Law
