= Alter Tsypkin =

Soviet legal scholar and lawyer (1891–1985)

- Born: 16 February 1891; Poltava (Ukrainian Soviet Socialist Republic)
- Died: 5 March 1985 (aged 94); Saratov (Soviet Union)
- Education: Doctor of Juridical Science
- Alma mater: Kharkov Institute of National Economy
- Employer: Saratov State Academy of Law (1931–1980)
- Awards: Order of the Badge of Honour (1961); Medal "For Valiant Labour in the Great Patriotic War 1941–1945"
- Position held: professor (1931–1980)

Alter Lvovich Tsypkin (Russian: Альтер Львович Цыпкин; 16 February 1891 – 5 March 1985) was a Soviet legal scholar, lawyer, Doctor of Law, professor and founder of the Department of Criminal Procedure Law of Saratov State Academy of Law. In 1947 during the anti-cosmopolitan campaign he was accused by the leadership of the academy of admiration for the "bourgeois West" for publishing his fundamental research Lawyer Secret (Note: Also known as Attorney-client privilege) (Адвокатская тайна). The work itself was banned in the Soviet Union.

== Biography ==
Alter Tsypkin was born on 16 February 1891 in Poltava, Russian Empire, into a Jewish family. In 1922 he graduated from the law faculty of the Kharkov Institute of National Economy. From 1922 to 1948 he worked as a lawyer at the Saratov Bar Association. In 1931 he was accepted as a lecturer at Saratov State Academy of Law. From 1931 to 1980 he held the positions of professor, head of the department of criminal procedure, professor-consultant. In 1938 he defended his Ph.D. thesis on the topic: "Judicial interrogation in the Soviet criminal process." In 1939 he received the academic title of Associate Professor. On May 13, 1955, he defended his doctoral dissertation on the topic: "The constitutional right to defense in the Soviet criminal process." In 1956 he received the academic title of professor. Tsypkin published more than 100 scientific papers. 12 PhD theses and one doctoral dissertation were defended under his supervision. For 13 years he was elected a deputy of the district and city Councils of Working People's Deputies in the city of Saratov. On 15 September 1961 he was awarded the Order of the Badge of Honour by the Decree of the Presidium of the Supreme Soviet for his great services in the training of specialists and the development of science. He was also awarded the Medal "For Valiant Labour in the Great Patriotic War 1941–1945". He died on 5 March 1985 in Saratov, Soviet Union.
