= Henri Temple =

French jurist

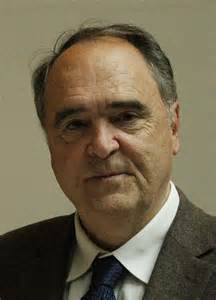
- Henri Temple
- Born: 1 November 1945 (age 80); Montpellier, France
- Known for: Lawyer, professor, politician, and essayist.

Henri Temple (born 1 November 1945, in Montpellier, France) is a French professor, lawyer, philosopher, and politician.

== Education ==
He received a Doctor of Juridical Science from University of Montpellier I with a thesis titled Les Sociétés de fait (partnerships by conduct or by estoppel). I with a thesis, "Les Sociétés de fait" (Partnerships by conduct or by estoppel).

== Professional career ==
In 1975, with Jean Calais-Auloy, he co-founded the first research centre in consumer protection. From 2000 to 2012, he served as the director of this centre.He was also an expert close to the United Nations and European Union. He taught in Côte d'Ivoire, United Kingdom, Belgium, Romania, Brasil, Algeria, Spain, Italy.

He is an international expert specialised in Economical Law and économics.

== Engagement in politics ==
He is a member of France Arise ("Debout la France"), a Gaullist party founded by Nicolas Dupont-Aignan and is in charge of Foreign Affairs in the shadow Cabinet.

=== Political philosophy ===
He is now well known in several countries for his major contribution to political philosophy with his General theory of the nation (2014). He innovates new concepts as "nationism" (a scientist approach of what a nation is, far from the violent nationalism), or the sociological precautionary principle explaining why and how a population can refuse massive immigration.

In 2024, he published Essai sur le concept de NATIONISME, Le théorème du nationisme : évidence des nations et cercle vertueux de conséquences. The first study on this new concept of Nationism, presented as a rational, democratic and efficient alternative both to dangerous nationalism and imperialism, and to failed euro-globalism.

== Books ==
=== Law and economics ===
- Les Sociétés de fait, theory, with a preface by Jean Calais-Auloy, Librairie générale de droit et de jurisprudence, 378 p., 1975.
- English traduction of the Code français de la consommation (with G. Woodroffe), Légifrance, 2003.
- Le droit de la consommation est-il subversif ? In Liber Amicorum, Jean Calais-Auloy, Dalloz, 2004.
- Quel droit de la consommation pour l'Afrique ?, Revue burkinabè de droit, 2004 (Burkina Faso).
- Droit de la consommation et économie de marché, Revue marketing et communication, 2005.
- L'OHADA : le droit au service du développement, Accomex, CCI Paris, April 2007.
- La traçabilité des produits alimentaires et non alimentaires, collection Techniques de l'ingénieur, November 2008.
- Une nouvelle mission de l'avocat, la prévention des risques judiciaires et des crises en matière de consommation, Revue française de gestion industrielle, Ecole de mines de Paris, September 2007.
- Les prescriptions civiles dans les relations entre professionnels et consommateurs, Les petites affiches, June 2009.
- Les mécanismes de réparation, in L'action collective ou action de groupe, Larcier, Belgique, October 2010 (Belgium).
- La responsabilité du fait des produits, Lamy Affaires, April 2010, p. 40.
- Droit de la consommation, with Jean Calais-Auloy, Dalloz, 736 p., 2010.
- Les recours collectifs, Liber amicorum Mario Frota, univ. Coïmbra, Portugal, 2012.
- Food Traceability and emerging technologies, Food biology series, Science Publishers, CRC Press (in Collab.D.Montet & Ramesh C. Ray, CIRAD2017 (USA)

=== Political Philosophy ===
- Essai sur le concept de NATIONISME, Le théorème du nationisme : évidence des nations et cercle vertueux de conséquences Sphairôs by Amazon, 2024
- Sentiment national et droit, Sherbrooke university, Canada 2012.
- Traité pratique de droit alimentaire (direction and redaction), 1403 p.
- Sentiment national et droits de l'homme, Cahiers de psychologie politique, n°25, août 2014
- Théorie générale de la nation. L'architecture du monde, preface of Gérard Lafay, L'Harmattan, 2014.
- Théorème du nationisme, Contemporaine évidence des nations, Cahiers de psychologie politique, n°27, août 2015
- Changement de paradigme : Les nations comme fondement intellectuel, moral, psycho-sociologique, économique, démocratique et diplomatique de l’architecture du monde, sur le site Le réveil français, 2015; et en russe Anri Tamplh, Natsionalnoïé gosoudarstvo... in Miéjdounarodnaïa Konférentsïa: Yalta 1945, éd. Astreïa, Moskva (Russie), 2015, 190 et s.
