= David Kershaw =

Professor of law

David Kershaw is Professor of Law at the London School of Economics and was formerly Dean of the Law School between 2021 and 2025. Kershaw earned an SJD from Harvard Law School. He is also a member of the LSE Council, the Governing Body of the London School of Economics. His research is focused on company law. As well as the author of a leading company law textbook, Kershaw's expertise focuses on accounting principles for companies, for which his work on post-Enron regulation received the Modern Law Review Wedderburn Prize, directors' duties, takeovers and workplace participation.

== Career ==
Kershaw qualified as a Solicitor at Herbert Smith, London and practised corporate law in the Mergers & Acquisitions Group of Shearman & Sterling in New York and London. After having completed his doctorate at Harvard Law School, Kershaw took up a lectureship at the University of Warwick Law Department in 2003. In 2006, he joined the Law Department of the LSE, where he was appointed full professor in 2010. He holds LLM and SJD degrees from Harvard Law School and an LLB from the University of Warwick.

== Publications ==
Articles

- Ferreira, Daniel, Kershaw, David, Kirchmaier, Tom and Schuster, Edmund (2021) Management insulation and bank failures. Journal of Financial Intermediation, 47
- Kershaw, David and Schuster, Edmund (2021), The Purposive Transformation of Corporate Law, American Journal of Comparative Law, 69 (3), 478.
- 'Consequential Responsibility for Client Wrongs: Lehman Brothers and the Regulation of the Legal Profession' (2013) 76 Modern Law Review 26-61 (with Richard Moorhead)
- 'Shareholder Empowerment and Bank Bailouts' (with Daniel Ferreira, Tom Kirchmaier and Edmund Schuster) [2013] ECGI - Finance Working Paper No. 345/2013.
- 'Involuntary Creditors and the Case for Accounting-Based Distribution Regulation' [2009] Journal of Business Law 140
- 'Between Law and Markets: Is there a Role for Culture and Ethics in Financial Regulation' (2013) 38 Delaware Journal of Corporate Law 191-245 (with Dan Awrey and William Blair)
- 'The Path of Corporate Fiduciary Law' (2012) 8 New York University Journal of Law and Business 395-485
- 'The Illusion of Importance: Reconsidering the UK's Takeover Defence Prohibition' (2007) 56 International and Comparative Law Quarterly 267-308
- 'Waiting for Enron: the Unstable Equilibrium of Auditor Independence Regulation' (2006) 33 Journal of Law and Society 388-420
- 'Evading Enron: Taking Principles Too Seriously in Accounting Regulation' (2005) 68 Modern Law Review 594-625
- 'Does it Matter How the Law Thinks About Corporate Opportunities' (2005) 25 Legal Studies 533-558
- 'Lost in Translation: Corporate Opportunities in Comparative Perspective' (2005) 25 Oxford Journal of Legal Studies 603-627
- 'No End in Sight for the History of Corporate Law: The Case of Employee Participation in Corporate Governance' (2002) 2 Journal of Corporate Law Studies 34-81

Books

- Principles of Takeover Regulation (Oxford University Press, 2016)
- Company law in context: Text and materials (Oxford University Press, 2nd ed. 2012)

== See also ==
- UK company law
- Mergers and acquisitions
