= Jeffrey Addicott =

American lawyer and university professor (born 1954)

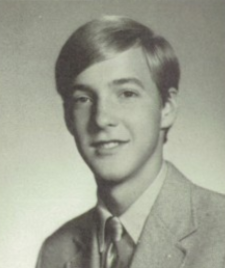
- Jeffrey Addicott (1972)
- Born: Jeffrey Frank Addicott; January 26, 1954 (age 72); Pensacola, Florida, U.S.
- Education: University of Maryland (BA); University of Alabama School of Law (JD); University of Virginia School of Law (LLM, SJD)
- Occupations: Lawyer, legal scholar
- Employer: St. Mary's University School of Law
- Spouse: Teresa M. Blake (m. 1999)
- Military Service
- Branch: United States Army
- Service years: 1980–2000
- Rank: Lieutenant colonel
- Units: J.A.G. Corps; Army Special Forces
- Awards: Legion of Merit

Jeffrey Frank Addicott (born January 26, 1954) is an American lawyer, legal scholar and educator. He is the Director of the Warrior Defense Project at St. Mary's University School of Law St. Mary's University School of Law in San Antonio, Texas.

== Biography ==
=== Education ===
Addicott went to college at the University of Maryland and graduated in 1976. He received his Juris Doctor (J.D.) degree in 1979 from the University of Alabama School of Law. He received two Master of Law (LL.M.) degrees in 1987 and 1992 from The Judge Advocate General's Legal Center and School and the University of Virginia School of Law respectively. He received a Doctor of Juridical Science from the University of Virginia School of Law in 1994.

=== Military service ===
From 1980 to 2000 he served in the United States Army as a judge advocate. He served as a senior legal advisor to the United States Army's Special Forces and later became the deputy director of the International & Operational Law Division of the Army's Judge Advocate General School. For his military service he was awarded the Legion of Merit. He retired as a lieutenant colonel.

=== Academic career ===
From 1980 to 1981 he was an adjunct professor at the University of Maryland teaching business law and government. From 1982 to 1983 he was adjunct professor at Central Texas College teaching business law. From 1984 to 1985 he was a professor at the Academy of Health Sciences in San Antonio, Texas, teaching health law. From 1988 to 1989 he was an adjunct professor at Chapman College in Tacoma, Washington, teaching graduate-level international law. From 1989 to 1992 he was the assistant chairman of the International Law Department at the Judge Advocate General's School in Charlottesville, Virginia, teaching graduate-level international law, national security law and criminal law. In 1995 he was an adjunct professor at Central Michigan University teaching graduate-level international law. In 1996 he was an adjunct professor at Central Texas College, Central Michigan University and Webster University teaching criminal law, graduate-level business law, and graduate-level administrative law. In 1997 he was an adjunct professor at Campbell University teaching business law. From 1998 to 2001 he was an adjunct professor at Central Michigan University teaching graduate-level international law and administrative law.

He later became a law professor in St. Mary's University School of Law in San Antonio, Texas. After the September 11, 2001 attacks, he shifted his focus on terrorism law, and in 2003 he was appointed as the director of St. Mary's University's Center for Terrorism Law. Since then Addicott has given more than 600 speeches and given interviews to leading news agencies more than 4,000 times. He also worked with the executive branch and the FBI during the presidency of George W. Bush.

== Notable public statements ==
During a speech at a rally to defend a statue honoring Confederate soldiers in Travis Park, Addicott said he'd "love to beat the living daylights" out of racists. He said that whether the statue should be removed had nothing to do with racism. He was criticized for the comments by St. Mary's president Thomas Mengler, as well as by alumni. Addicott later told a columnist for a local newspaper that he had made a mistake.
