= Charles Udenze Ilegbune =

Nigerian academic and lawyer

Prof. Charles Udenze Ilegbune SAN, OON
- Born: November 1939 (age 86); Igbariam
- Occupations: Lawyer, Academic, Researcher

Academic background
- Education: Obafemi Awolowo University, London School of Economics & Political Science; Nigerian Law School, Lagos
- Thesis: British concessions policy and legislation in southern Ghana, 1874-1915. (1974)

Academic work
- Discipline: Solicitor
- Institutions: St. Francis Primary School Ikem-Nando, St. Augustine's School Umuoba-Anam, Obafemi Awolowo University lle-Ife, University of Nigeria, Nsukka, Chicago State University Illinois USA, Nnamdi Azikiwe University, Abia State University, University of Abuja
- Notable ideas: The founder and Principal Partner of Ilegbune & Ilegbune & Co.
- Website: http://ilegbune.com/

Charles Udenze Ilegbune OON, SAN is a Nigerian professor of law at the University of Abuja and a senior advocate of Nigeria. He is a former deputy vice-chancellor of University of Nigeria Nsukka, where he also served as the dean and head of department of the faculty of law. He is a member of African Bar Association, a recipient of Order of the Niger. He is also the founder and principal partner of Ilegbune & Ilegbune & Co. Enugu.

== Early life and education ==
Udenze was born on November 4, 1939, to Chief Ilegbune Oguejiofor and Dakwasi-Enyi Adaeze Caroline Ilegbune at Igbariam, Anambra East Local Government Area, Anambra State. He obtained his First School Leaving Certificate (FSLC) in 1952 from St. Anthony's School, Igbariam. He received his Preliminary Teachers' Certificate (PTC) in 1953 from Preliminary Training Centre Nimo, Njikoka LGA. He obtained his GCE O level and A Level in 1959 and 1961 respectively. He obtained his Bachelor of Law (LL.B) in 1966 from Obafemi Awolowo University, Masters of Law (LL.M) in 1971 and doctorate degree in Law (PhD) in 1974 from London School of Economics & Political Science of the University of London. In 1977 he obtained his Barrister-al-Law (B. L) from Nigerian Law School, Lagos.

== Academic career ==
Udenze started his career at St. Francis Primary School Ikem-Nando in 1952. In 1959, he moved to St. Augustine's School Umuoba-Anam and in 1962 he was transferred to St Anthony's School Igbariam. In 1974, he moved to the higher institution, where he was appointed as lecturer II at Obafemi Awolowo University lle-Ife. In 1976, he was promoted to lecturer I and senior lecturer in 1979 and in the same year, he moved to University of Nigeria, Nsukka. Between 1984 and 1985 he was an adjunct associate professor of law, Chicago State University Illinois, US. In 1986, he became adjunct senior lecturer in Law, Anambra State University of Science and Technology, ASUTECH (now Nnamdi Azikiwe University, UNIZIK). In 1987, he was promoted to adjunct professor of law, Abia State University, Uturu, and in 1988 he was promoted to professor of law at the University of Nigeria Nsukka Enugu Campus. In 1998, he moved to University of Abuja, where he is up till today.

== Administrative appointments ==
Udenze was appointed as the headmaster of St. Francis School, Ikem-Nando in 1954 and became the headmaster of St. Anthony's School, Igbariam, in 1962. He became the deputy dean of law at the University of Nigeria Nsukka in 1981, head of Department of Commercial and Property Law in 1986, dean of Faculty of Law, University of Nigeria, in 1987 and deputy vice-chancellor of the same institution in 1995. When he moved to University of Abuja, he was also made the dean of Faculty of Law of the institution in 1998.

== Legal career ==
Udenze served as the founder and principal partner of Ilegbune & Ilegbune & Co. Enugu between 1989 and 1992. He has litigation experience in both state, federal trial and appellate courts. He has represented clients in court cases, administrative proceedings, and arbitration panels. Some of them are Garland Enterprises (Nig) Ltd between 1981 and 1984; Gold (Nig) Ltd Enugu between 1982 and 1984; Agrotek (Nig) Ltd, Edo & Delta States between 1982 and 1984.

Also, he served as the external adviser and solicitor to; Oranyel & Sons Ltd Asaba, between 1982 and 1984; Co-Operative & Commerce Bank Pic between 1987 and 1998; Berman Development Co. Ltd between 1988 1992; Premier Breweries Plc Onitsha between 1988 and 1989; British American Insurance Co. Plc Lagos between 1988 and 1993; NEPA Plc, 1988-up till date; UBA Plc 1990- up till date and in 1993 he drafted a Commission Comprehensive Environmental Protection for Abia State Government.

== Membership and fellowship ==
Udenze is a member of Nigerian Bar Association (NBA), Africa Bar Association (ABA), Commonwealth Legal Education Association (CLEA), International Bar Association (IBA), International Third World Legal Studies Associate (INTWORLSA), Nigerian Association of Law Teachers (NALT), Nigerian Constitutional Law Association (NCLA), African Network for the Prevention Against Child Abuse and Neglect (ANPPCAN), and the African Society of International and Comparative Law (ASICL).

== Awards and honours ==
In 1993, Ilegbune was given the high chieftaincy title of Owelle of Igbariam. In 1994, he was given the traditional title of Nwaezeatuegwu and in 2005 he was given National Honour and title of Officer of the Order of Nigeria (OON) by the President of Nigeria.

== Selected publications ==
- Ilegbune, C. U. (1974). British concessions policy and legislation in Southern Ghana, 1874–1915 (Doctoral dissertation, London School of Economics and Political Science (University of London).
- Ilegbune, C. U. (1976). Concessions Scramble and Land Alienation in British Southern Ghana, 1881515-19 1.
- Ilegbune, C. U. (1970). A critique of the Nigerian law of divorce under the matrimonial causes Decree 1970. Journal of African Law, 14(3), 178–197.
- Adeogun, A. A., Cottrell, J., Ewelukwa, D. I. O., Abdulai, A., & Ilegbune, C. U. (1976). Survey of Legal Developments in Nigeria 1975. Nigerian LJ, 10, 122.
- Ilegbune, C. U. (1977). Third-Party Claim Against Insurer: Can Notice of Proceeding Really Be Dispensed With
- Ezejiofor, Gaius, Cyprian Okechukwu Okonkwo, and C. U. Ilegbune. Nigerian business law. Sweet & Maxwell, 1982.
- Ilegbune, C. U. "Commercial Law Controversies: Owners Interim Right of Removal of Motor Vehicles Under S. 9 (5) of the Hire-Purchase Act 1965'
