= Thomas Poole (academic) =

Thomas Poole is a professor of law at LSE Law School, specialising in public law and jurisprudence. Poole joined LSE in 2006, and was promoted to professor in 2015.

== Works ==
- Poole, Thomas (2015). Reason of State: Law, Prerogative and Empire. Cambridge University Press. ISBN 978-1-107-08989-1.
