= International Journal of Discrimination and the Law =

- Discipline: Law
- Language: English
- Edited by: Nicole Busby and Grace James

Publication details
- History: 1995-present
- Publisher: SAGE Publications
- Frequency: Quarterly

Standard abbreviations
- ISO 4: Int. J. Discrim. Law

Indexing
- ISSN: 1358-2291
- OCLC no.: 663403901

Links
- Journal homepage; Online access; Online archive

The International Journal of Discrimination and the Law is a quarterly peer-reviewed academic journal covering the field of law in connection with discrimination. The issues covered in this journal include racism and sex discrimination, the treatment of asylum-seekers and refugees, immigration and nationality, discrimination on grounds disability, sexual or political orientation, age and ill-health, in relation to access to employment, housing, education and other services. The editors-in-chief are Laura Carlson (Stockholm University), James Hand (University of Portsmouth), and Panos Kapotas (University of Portsmouth). It was established in 1995 and is currently published by SAGE Publications.

== Abstracting and indexing ==
The International Journal of Discrimination and the Law is abstracted and indexed in:

- Criminal Justice Abstracts
- PsycINFO
- Social Services Abstracts
- Scopus
