= Neil Duxbury =

British legal scholar

Neil Duxbury is a British legal scholar.

== Education ==
He received his LLB degree from the University of Hull Law School in 1984. He received his PhD from London School of Economics in 1988.

== Career ==
Duxbury is a professor of English law at the London School of Economics. He was elected as a Fellow of the British Academy in 2010.

== Bibliography ==
Some of his books are:

- Patterns of American Jurisprudence
- The Nature and Authority of Precedent
- Elements of Legislation
- Jurists and Judges: An Essay on Influence
- Random Justice: On Lotteries And Legal Decision Making
- Frederick Pollock and the English Juristic Tradition
