= Modern Law Review =

Peer-reviewed academic journal

- Discipline: Law
- Language: English
- Edited by: David Kershaw

Publication details
- History: 1937–present
- Frequency: Bi-monthly

Standard abbreviations
- Bluebook: Mod. L. Rev.
- ISO 4: Mod. Law Rev.

Indexing
- ISSN: 0026-7961 (print); 1468-2230 (web)
- JSTOR: 00267961
- OCLC no.: 417039001

Links
- Journal homepage; Online access; Online archive

The Modern Law Review is a peer-reviewed academic journal published by John Wiley & Sons on behalf of Modern Law Review Ltd. and which has traditionally maintained close academic ties with the faculty of law at the London School of Economics and Political Science. The Modern Law Review has been identified as the "pre-eminent United Kingdom law journal" in a ranking based on statistical data from the 2001 Research Assessment Exercise, and has been placed in the highest tier (A*) by the 2019 Israeli Inter-University Committее Report.

The journal is a general law review that publishes original articles relating to common law jurisdictions and the law of the European Union. In addition, the journal contains sections devoted to recent legislation and reports, to case analysis, to review articles, and to book reviews. The current editor-in-chief (General Editor) is Thomas Poole. Previous editors included Lord Chorley, Lord Wedderburn, Hugh Collins, Julia Black and David Kershaw.

The contents of the first 59 volumes (published between 1937 and 1996) are freely available online; more recent volumes are available on a subscription basis.

== Foundations ==
The Modern Law Review Ltd. is a charity that was established in 1937 to promote the study of law and related fields. To this end, it publishes the law review and organises lectures and seminars and offers scholarships and awards. In addition, the review provides the funding to host the annual Chorley Lecture.

== Chorley Lecture ==
The annual Chorley Lectures started in 1972 and are named in honour of Robert Chorley, 1st Baron Chorley, the founding editor of the Modern Law Review. The lecture is usually delivered in early June at the London School of Economics and subsequently published as the lead article in the January issue of the following year's volume.

== Wedderburn Prize ==
The annual Wedderburn Prize is awarded for "a contribution to that year's volume which in the opinion of the editorial committee is exemplary of the type of scholarship that The Modern Law Review aims to promote". It is named in honour of Lord Wedderburn of Charlton, who served as general editor of the review from 1971 to 1988. Preference is given to the work of authors who are at a relatively early stage of their careers. Previous winners of the Wedderburn Prize include Kimberlee Weatherall, David Kershaw, and Nico Krisch.
