= Tulane Law Review =

- A typical Tulane Law Review cover
- Discipline: law, civil law, comparative law, admiralty law
- Language: English

Publication details
- History: 1916
- Publisher: Tulane University Law School (United States)
- Frequency: 5/year

Standard abbreviations
- Bluebook: Tul. L. Rev.
- ISO 4: Tulane Law Rev.

Links
- Journal homepage

The Tulane Law Review, a publication of the Tulane University Law School, was founded in 1916, and is currently published five times annually. The Law Review has an international circulation.

== History ==
The Law Review was started as the Southern Law Quarterly by Rufus Carrollton Harris, the school's twelfth dean. Charles E. Dunbar, Jr., the civil service reformer who became a Tulane law professor, served on the board of advisory editors of the Tulane Law Review from its inception until his death in 1959.

A 1937 Time magazine about Rufus Harris describes the Tulane Law Review as "nationally famed".

== Membership ==
Membership of the Tulane Law Review is conferred upon Tulane law students who have "outstanding scholastic records or demonstrated ability in legal research and writing". Specifically, membership is chosen based on a student's law school grades and/or performance in an annual anonymous writing competition.

== Alumni ==
- Pablo Carrillo – counsel to John McCain
- Martin Leach-Cross Feldman – federal judge on the United States District Court for the Eastern District of Louisiana
- Victoria Reggie Kennedy – wife of Senator Ted Kennedy
- William H. Pryor, Jr. – federal judge on the United States Court of Appeals for the Eleventh Circuit; former Attorney General of the State of Alabama from 1997 to 2004
- Eleni M. Roumel – federal judge on the United States Court of Federal Claims
- Whitney Gaskell – novelist

== Significant articles ==
- L.C. Green, "Legal Issues of the Eichmann Trial", Tul. L. Rev. 641 (1962)
- Nicolas DeB Katzenbach, "Protest, Politics, and the First Amendment", Tul. L. Rev. (1970)
- Barry Sullivan, "The Honest Muse: Judge Wisdom and the Uses of History", 60 Tul. L. Rev. 314 (1985)
- Julius Getman, "The Changing Role of Courts and the Potential Role of Unions In Overcoming Employment Discrimination", 64 Tul. L. Rev. 1477 (1990)
- William Page, "Ideological Conflict and the Origins of Antitrust Policy", 66 Tul. L. Rev. 1 (1991)
- Harry Simon, "Towns Without Pity: A Constitutional and Historical Analysis of Official Efforts to Drive Homeless Persons From American Cities", 66 Tul. L. Rev. 631 (1992)
- Frederick M. Lawrence, "Civil Rights and Criminal Wrongs: The Mens Rea of Federal Civil Rights Crimes", 67 Tul. L. Rev. 2113 (1993)
- Miriam Galston, "Activism and Restraint: The Evolution of Harlan Fiske Stone's Judicial Philosophy", 70 Tul. L. Rev. (1995)
- Michael B. Rappaport, "The Selective Nondelegation Doctrine and the Line Item Veto: A New Approach to the Nondelegation Doctrine and Its Implications for Clinton v. City of New York", 76 Tul. L. Rev. 265 (2001)
- Robert Ashford, "Binary Economics, Fiduciary Duties, and Corporate Social Responsibility: Comprehending Corporate Wealth Maximization and Distribution for Stockholders, Stakeholders, and Society", 76 Tul. L. Rev. 5 (2002)
- William W. Bratton, "Enron and the Dark Side of Shareholder Value", Tul. L. Rev. (2002)
- Joel W. Friedman, "Desegregating the South: John Minor Wisdom's Role in Enforcing Brown's Mandate", 78 Tul. L. Rev. 6 (2004)
- Royce de Rohan Barondes, "NASD Regulation of IPO Conflicts of Interest – Does Gatekeeping Work?", 79 Tul. L. Rev. (2005)
- James F. Barger Jr. et al., "States, Statutes, and Fraud: An Empirical Study of Emerging State False Claims Acts", Tul. L. Rev. (2005).
- Robert H. Lande and John M. Connor, "How High Do Cartels Raise Prices? Implications for Reform of the Antitrust Sentencing Guidelines", Tul. L. Rev. (2005)
- Rebekah Page, "Forcible Medication and the Fourth Amendment: A New Framework for Protecting Nondangerous Mentally Ill Pretrial Detainees Against Unreasonable Governmental Intrusions Into the Body", 79 Tul. L. Rev. 1065 (2005)
- Stuart P. Green, "Looting, Law, and Lawlessness", 81 Tul. L. Rev. 1129 (2007)

== See also ==
- Civil Law Commentaries
- Tulane Journal of International and Comparative Law
- Tulane Journal of Technology and Intellectual Property
- Tulane Maritime Law Journal
