= Paul William Brosman =

- Brosman pictured in The Jambalaya 1940, Tulane yearbook
- Born: November 9, 1899; Albion, Illinois
- Died: December 21, 1955 (aged 56); Washington D.C.
- Known for: Dean of Tulane University Law School; District Court judge
- Scientific career
- Fields: Law
- Institutions: Tulane University

Paul William Brosman (November 9, 1899 – December 21, 1955) was the 13th dean of the Tulane University Law School, serving from 1937 to 1951. According to Edward F. Sherman, he "was on the first civilian Court of Military Appeals created by the UCMJ in 1951 and played a role in the 'civilianizing' of military justice procedures." He was born in Albion, Illinois, and died in Washington D.C.

He graduated in 1924 from the University of Illinois where he was president of Phi Kappa Tau fraternity. He also attended Indiana University and Yale University. He was an instructor in business law at Indiana University in the 1920s and later professor of law at Mercer University. He came to Tulane in 1932 and became assistant dean in 1935 and dean in 1937. He was an Army veteran of World War I and during World War II was chief of the Military Justice Division, Office of the Air Judge Advocate of the Air Force Headquarters.

Academic offices
Preceded by Rufus Carrollton Harris	Tulane University Law School Dean; 1937 – 1951	Succeeded by William Ray Forrester
