= Rufus Carrollton Harris =

American academic administrator (1896–1988)

- Harris pictured in The Jambalaya 1929, Tulane yearbook
- Born: January 2, 1896; Walton County, Georgia, United States
- Died: August 18, 1988 (aged 92); Macon, Georgia
- Education: Mercer University; Yale University
- Known for: Tulane University president; Tulane University Law School dean; Rufus Carrollton Harris, CLA 1917, dean of Mercer Law School, 1925-1927, and Tulane Law School, 1927-1937; president, Tulane University, 1939-1960; president, Mercer University, 1960-1979; co-authored the G.I. Bill
- Scientific career
- Fields: Law
- Workplaces: Tulane University; Mercer University

Rufus Carrollton Harris (c. 1898 – August 18, 1988) was the president of Tulane University from 1937 to 1959 and the 12th dean of the Tulane University Law School, from 1927 to 1937.

== Education ==
He completed his undergraduate studies at Mercer University and earned two law degrees at Yale University, where he completed his Juris Doctor degree in 1924. He left Tulane to become the President of Mercer University. He co-authored the GI Bill.

== Role as Tulane University Law School dean ==
While at the Tulane Law School, he established the Tulane Law Review.

Academic offices
Preceded by Rufus Edward Foster	Tulane University Law School Dean; 1927 – 1937	Succeeded by Paul William Brosman
Preceded by Robert Leonval Menuet	Tulane University President; 1937 – 1959	Succeeded by Maxwell Edward Lapham
