= William Ray Forrester =

- Forrester pictured in The Jambalaya 1953, Tulane yearbook
- Born: January 14, 1911; Little Rock, Arkansas
- Died: February 16, 2001 (aged 90); San Francisco, California
- Known for: Tulane University Law School dean Vanderbilt University Law School dean Cornell University Law School dean
- Scientific career
- Fields: Law

William Ray Forrester (January 14, 1911 – February 16, 2001) served as the dean of three law schools: (1) Vanderbilt University Law School; (2) Tulane University Law School; and (3) Cornell University Law School.

Forrester was born in Little Rock, Arkansas. He earned his B.A. degree from the University of Arkansas and his J.D. degree from the University of Chicago Law School.

Forrester served as Dean of the Vanderbilt Law School in Nashville, Tennessee from 1949 to 1952, at Tulane from 1952 to 1963, and at Cornell University Law School in Ithaca, New York from 1963 to 1973.

Academic offices
Preceded by Paul William Brosman	Tulane University Law School Dean; 1952 – 1963	Succeeded by Cecil Morgan
