= A. N. Yiannopoulos =

Greek-born American law professor (1928–2017)

Athanassios Nicholas "Thanassi" Yiannopoulos (March 13, 1928, in Thessaloniki, Greece – February 1, 2017, in New Orleans, Louisiana) was a professor at Tulane University Law School, expert on civil law and comparative law, and founder of the Civil Law Commentaries.

He acquired his law degree at the Law School of the Aristotle University and continued his graduate studies at the University of Chicago Law School (where he studied on a Fulbright Scholarship and graduated with a Master of Comparative Law in 1954), the University of California, Berkeley (where he graduated with an LL.M. and a J.S.D.), and the University of Cologne.

Yiannopoulos was an internationally renowned scholar of civil law, comparative law, and maritime law. From 1958 to 1979, Yiannopoulos served on the faculty of Louisiana State University's Paul M. Hebert Law Center. He joined the faculty of Tulane University Law School in 1979. Yiannopoulos was in charge of the revision of the Louisiana Civil Code as reporter for the Louisiana State Law Institute and was the editor of West's Pamphlet Edition of the Louisiana Civil Code since 1980. He also authored three volumes of the Louisiana Civil Law Treatise series, now in the fourth edition. Yiannopoulos was published widely in the fields of civil law, comparative law, conflict of laws, and admiralty. He directed the Tulane University Law School's summer programs in Greece since 1980. At the time of his death, he was revising portions of the civil code, collecting materials for an admiralty textbook, and working on the next edition of his property treatise. His revision of the Civil Code provisions on quasi-contracts became law in 1996, on representation and mandate in 1998, on deposit and sequestration in 2003, and on loan in 2004. Yiannopoulos was a member of the International Academy of Comparative Law (The Hague) and of the American Law Institute. He retired from the full-time faculty at the end of the 2007–2008 academic year but continued to teach one course each year in his area of expertise.
