= Pablo Carrillo =

American political consultant

Pablo E. Carrillo (born 1969) is a one-time admiralty lawyer from New Orleans, Louisiana, who was U.S. Senator John McCain's chief of staff. In that capacity, Carrillo led McCain's investigations of the Jack Abramoff tribal lobbying scandal and the KC-X Boeing tanker scandal, which McCain referred to extensively throughout his campaign.

== Role in Jack Abramoff Tribal lobbying scandal ==
Carrillo served, as The Washington Monthly described in May 2006, as "McCain's wingman on Indian Affairs", as his Chief Investigative Counsel on the Senate Indian Affairs Committee. There, Carrillo led a high-profile investigation into allegations that flamboyant GOP lobbyist Jack Abramoff and his partner Michael Scanlon, a former aide of House Leader Tom Delay, bilked several Indian tribes out of tens of millions of dollars. Holding what Vanity Fair described as "five gory, highly publicized [hearings] in 2004 and 2005" on that issue, Carrillo's investigation first exposed Abramoff and Scanlon's scheme to defraud these tribes and led to, according to The Washington Post, "one of the widest ranging federal corruption investigations in decades," which "may help McCain, a likely contender for the Republican presidential nomination in 2008, reinforce his image as a Washington reformer and a proponent of campaign finance reform."

That investigation was also described by Roll Call as "set[ting] a standard for what Congressional oversight should be, but often isn't" and the New York Post as giving rise to possibly "the worst Washington corruption scandal since the Abscam sting nailed six congressmen and a senator 25 years ago." It helped expose wrongdoing that recently led to, among other things, guilty pleas from Abramoff, Michael Scanlon, a US congressman, and two senior congressional staffers on fraud and public corruption charges; a guilty plea from the head of a bogus non-profit organization for lying to Congress and tax fraud; the conviction of the Bush White House's chief of procurement policy and a former deputy Interior secretary for, among other things, lying to Congress; the development of lobbying reform legislative initiatives; and the publication of a major Senate report, called "'Gimme Five'—Investigation of Tribal Lobbying Matters".

== Role in the Boeing tanker scandal ==
Carrillo led McCain's investigation of the Air Force's decision to replace its tanker fleet by leasing airplanes from Boeing. The investigation resulted in a major corruption scandal, which led to successful prosecutions of Boeing's CFO Michael M. Sears and senior Air Force official Darleen Druyun; and Boeing being forced to deduct about a half-billion dollars in payments required under a global settlement agreement with the Justice Department.

The investigation received widespread praise: The Seattle Times described that investigation as "hav[ing] outmaneuvered Air Force brass and Boeing's 35 person Washington lobbying operation in a classic Washington power play and a media blitz worthy of Madison Avenue"; a major watchdog group as "congressional oversight at its best, something we rarely see anymore"; and The New Yorker as "burnish[ing] [McCain's] reputation as a giant killer." Carrillo's role in that investigation was profiled by the National Journal's CongressDaily and the investigation, in among others places, 60 Minutes Wednesday.

== Other ==
Carrillo is a graduate of Tulane University and Tulane Law School, where he served as Managing Editor for the Tulane Law Review.
