= Robert Joseph Pothier =

French jurist (1699–1772)

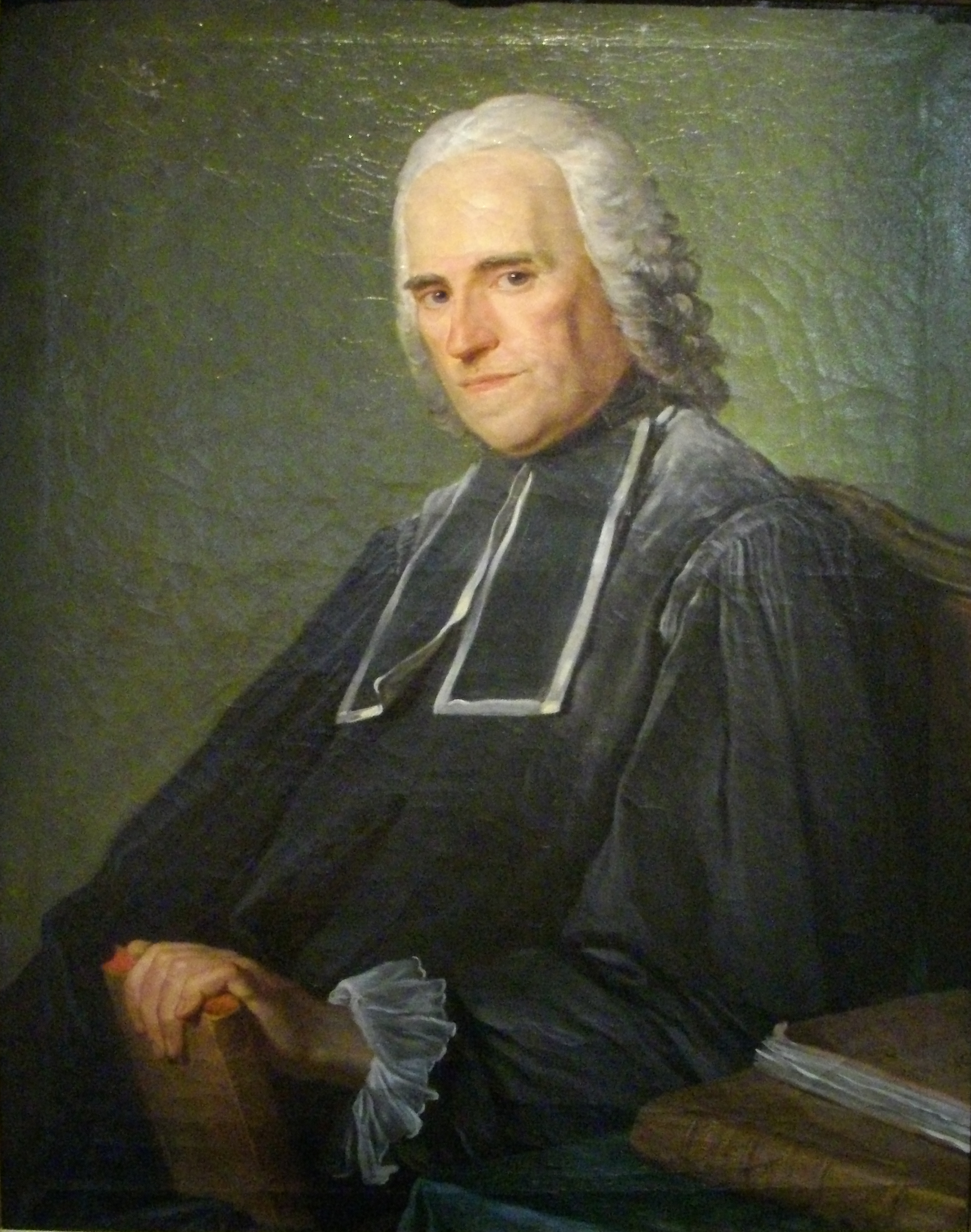
- Born: 9 January 1699; Orléans, Orléanais, Kingdom of France
- Died: 2 March 1772 (aged 73); Orléans, Kingdom of France
- Resting place: Orléans Cathedral
- Occupation: jurist

Robert Joseph Pothier (9 January 1699 – 2 March 1772) was a French jurist.

== Life ==
He was born and died at Orléans. He studied law to qualify for the magistracy, and was appointed Judge in 1720 of the Presidial Court of Orléans, following in the footsteps of his father and grandfather. He held the post for fifty-two years.

Pothier paid particular attention to the correction and co-ordination of the text of the Pandects. His Pandectae Justinianae in novum ordinem digestae (Paris and Chartres, 1748–1752) is a classic in the study of Roman law. In 1749 he was made professor of law at the University of Orleans.

He wrote many learned monographs on French law, and much of his work was incorporated almost textually in the French Code Civil. His theories on the law of contract were influential in England as well as in the United States.

Pothier devised a law limiting recovery in the case of improper performance of a contractual obligation to those damages which are foreseeable.

His wrote numerous treatises. His works have been published in collected form on several occasions, the first edited by Giffrein in 1820–1824.

== Works ==
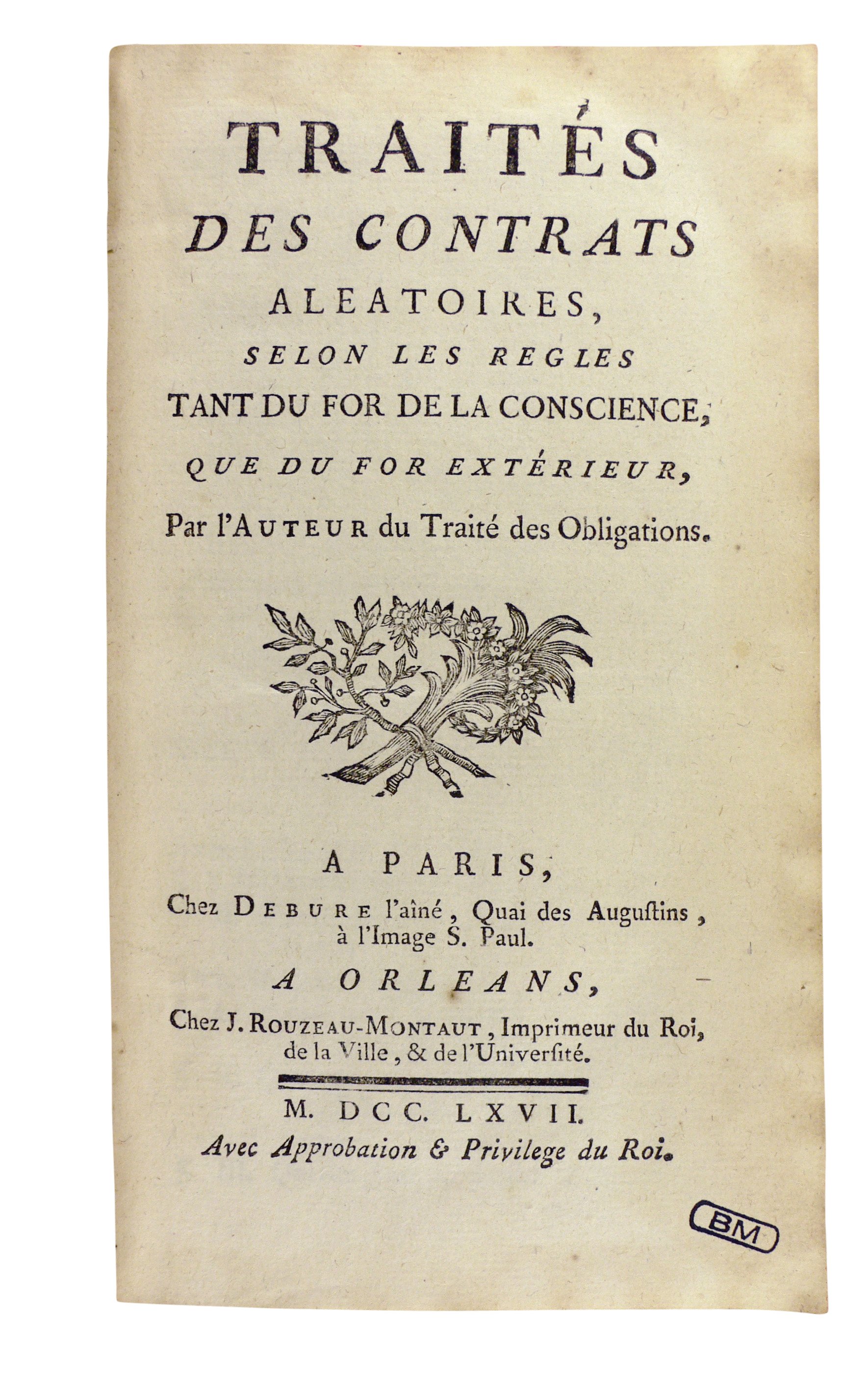
Title page of Traités des contrats aléatoires, published 1767

- Coutume d'Orléans, Orléans, 1740; 1760.
  - Coutumes des duchè, bailliage et prévôté d'Orléans, et ressort d'iceux (in French). Paris: Jean Debure. 1772.
- Traité des obligations (1761)
- Du Contrat de vente (1762)
- Du Contrat de bail (1764)
- Du Contrat de société (1765)
- Des Contrats de prêt de consomption (1766)
- Du Contrat de depot et de mandat (1766)
- Du Contrat de nantissement (1767)
- Traite de la Communaute, Auquel on a joint un Traite de la Puissance du Mari sur la personne & les biens de la Femme.(1770)

== Legacy ==
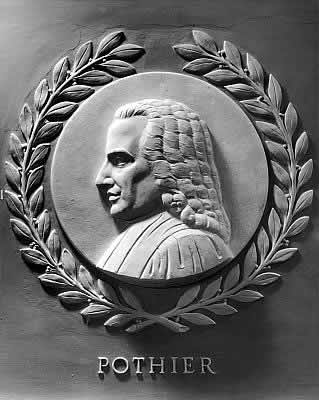
Bas-relief by Joseph Kiselewski (1950) at the chambers of the United States House of Representatives

According to Janwillem Oosterhuis, "like Domat, Pothier's methodology did not consist of constructing an ideal type of Natural law but rather the application of rationalistic methods to existing law, in particular Roman law and customary law."

== Translations ==
- Traité des obligations:
  - François-Xavier Martin, trans. A Treatise on Obligations, Considered in a Moral and Legal View. Newburn, N.C.: Martin & Ogden, 1802 (reprint Union, N.J.: Lawbook Exchange, 1999).
  - William David Evans, trans. A Treatise on the Law of Obligations, or Contract, 2nd American edn. Philadelphia: R. H. Small, 1839.
