= Tulane Environmental Law Clinic =

American legal clinic

The Tulane Environmental Law Clinic (TELC) is a legal clinic that Tulane Law School has operated since 1989 to offer law students the practical experience of representing real clients in actual legal proceedings under state and federal environmental laws.

== Mission ==
TELC's mission is to 1) train effective and ethical lawyers by guiding law students through actual client representation; 2) expand access to the legal system, especially for those who could not otherwise afford competent legal help on environmental issues; and 3) bolster community members' capacity to participate effectively in environmental decisions.

TELC is part of Tulane University School of Law's environmental law program and has become one of Louisiana's premier public interest legal services organizations, known especially for its work on environmental justice issues. On behalf of their clients, TELC students and supervising attorneys litigate environmental citizen suits to abate industrial pollution, appeal permits for environmental pollution or destruction of wetlands, challenge agency regulations that fall short of legislative mandates, and prod agencies to perform statutory duties. Louisiana state courts, and most federal courts in Louisiana, have adopted "student practice" rules that allow TELC students to appear and argue in court.

The American Bar Association honored TELC as co-recipient of its first "Award for Distinguished Achievement in Environmental Law and Policy" in 2000. In 2010, the New Orleans chapter of the Federal Bar Association honored TELC with its Camille F. Gravel Jr. Pro Bono Award In addition, TELC was a runner up for the National Law Journal's Lawyer of the Year award in 1998.

== Cases ==
Attorney Suzanne S. Dickey has explained that TELC student attorneys have "handled cases involving all aspects of environmental law, including air pollution, conservation of natural resources, urban land use and siting of waste facilities." Some examples appear below.

- Air pollution: TELC student-attorneys filed a Clean Air Act citizen suit in which the court ruled that a St. Bernard Parish oil refinery violated the Clean Air Act more than 2600 times. A court in another TELC-handled case vacated a Louisiana Department of Environmental Quality (LDEQ) permit which purported to waive Clean Air Act requirements for prevention of deterioration of air quality. On behalf of the Louisiana Environmental Action Network (LEAN), TELC has prosecuted a series of cases to promote cleaner air in Baton Rouge, Louisiana. As part of this effort, TELC obtained court orders that 1) vacated an EPA attempt to extend Louisiana's deadline for achieving health protection standards for ozone air pollution in the Baton Rouge Area, and 2) vacated EPA's approval of an inter-pollutant trading plan that would have allowed Louisiana to increase emissions of volatile organic compounds in return for reductions in oxides of nitrogen (NOx). TELC and LEAN also obtained a court order that required EPA to make a determination that increased the stringency of emission controls in the Baton Rouge area, and obtained statements from EPA and LDEQ admitting that Louisiana was operating a "bank" for emissions trading that failed to meet minimum Clean Air Act requirements.
- Water pollution: TELC student attorneys engage in administrative actions to convince LDEQ to implement the Clean Water Act's anti-degradation provisions, including rules to protect streams designated as "outstanding natural resource waters." TELC settled a case on behalf of coalition of environmental organizations to require cleanup of mercury leaked from meters used to monitor gas wells near Monroe, Louisiana, where many streams are under mercury advisories. In addition, TELC is prosecuting a case to enjoin discharges of waste that allegedly passes through and interferes with a municipal sewage treatment plant in the Town of Independence, Tangipahoa Parish, Louisiana, causing violations of Clean Water Act standards for discharges into the Tangipahoa River. On October 9, 2001, TELC filed a petition on behalf of a coalition of community groups that asked EPA to withdraw Louisiana's authority to administer the Clean Water Act's discharge permitting program because of inadequate enforcement and LDEQ's failure to comply with requirements for issuance of permits. EPA responded with a February 14, 2003, letter to Louisiana Governor Mike Foster raising "serious concerns" about the state program and setting forth a list of "performance measures" and schedule for the state to restore "program integrity." On May 13, 2004, EPA "notified [Louisiana] Governor Kathleen Blanco of the completion of the performance measures."
- Stormwater: On April 12, 2001, TELC provided notice to the owner of a local dairy of the Felicity Street Redevelopment Project, Inc.'s intent to take action about pollutant discharges into storm water drains. The dairy owner responded by detailing steps it had taken to achieve compliance and invited TELC's client to inspect the improved facility.
- Wetlands: TELC's work on behalf of the Gulf Restoration Network includes a case seeking to enjoin destruction of wetlands near Bay St. Louis, Mississippi. TELC student attorneys also mounted a successful challenge to the U.S. Army Corps of Engineers' issuance of a permit to destroy wetlands bordering Timber Creek, in St. Tammany Parish, Louisiana, without considering cumulative impacts. Additionally, on behalf of a coalition of environmental groups, TELC appeared as amicus in a case that rejected a U.S. Army Corps of Engineers' exemption for a cypress harvesting operation in wetlands from the Clean Water Act's permitting system because the Corps failed to show that the tree harvesting operation falls within the Act's "on-going silviculture" exception.
- Landfills: In a case that TELC handled on behalf of the Oakville Community Action Group, the court revoked a permit for expansion of the Industrial Pipe landfill, which looms over the predominantly African-American community of Oakville in Plaquemines Parish, Louisiana. In another TELC-handled case, the court set aside a contract for St. Helena Parish to host a new landfill for 50 years because of violations of Louisiana's open meetings law. After Hurricane Katrina and Hurricane Rita, LDEQ issued emergency orders to waive rules that normally prohibit disposal of most household wastes in landfills that lack systems to prevent contamination of groundwater, such as systems for monitoring groundwater and collecting leachate. On behalf of LEAN and Sierra Club, TELC brought a lawsuit in federal court, alleging that federal law barred LDEQ's waivers under the doctrine of preemption. While the lawsuit was pending, TELC and the LDEQ engaged in negotiations that resulted in several improvements to the emergency orders. For example, on January 19, 2007, LDEQ removed "household hazardous waste . . . where segregation is not practicable" from the list of materials that the Secretary authorized the landfills to accept. Also on January 19, 2007, LDEQ added language to the orders to require compliance with Clean Air Act standards for disposal of asbestos. On March 19, 2007, LDEQ again amended the orders to narrow their application to seven landfills effective April 20, 2007. On September 5, 2007, however, the court dismissed the plaintiffs' lawsuit, ruling that the plaintiffs lacked standing to sue.
- Wildlife: TELC represented Sierra Club as amicus in an Endangered Species Act case in which the court ordered the U.S. Department of Interior to designate critical habitat for protection of the Louisiana black bear. In addition, on July 25, 2002, TELC negotiated a settlement on behalf of Coalition for Louisiana Animal Advocates which required the U.S. Army to refrain from roundup and removal of wild horses from Fort Polk in the Kisatchie National Forest until completing an Environmental Impact Statement or Environmental Assessment.
- Global warming: On behalf of Sierra Club, the Alliance for Affordable Energy and others, TELC engaged in litigation to oppose construction of new coal-fired power plants which, if built, would release pollutants associated with climate change. As part of this effort, TELC submitted an April 1, 2008, notice of intent to sue Entergy about an effort to convert its Little Gypsy power plant to burn coal and petroleum coke. Entergy responded by announcing on April 23, 2008, that it would delay construction until it received government-approved limits for hazardous air pollutants. Entergy received these limits in a permit modification on about February 26, 2009. Meanwhile, however, on February 18, 2009, the Louisiana Public Service Commission (LPSC) administrative law judge heard oral argument from a TELC student attorney and others about whether Entergy must reveal data to show whether the project is economically viable. On March 13, 2008, LPSC ordered Entergy to suspend the project pending a review of economic viability. On April 1, 2009, Entergy submitted its review and asked LPSC for "a longer-term delay (three years or more)" of the project.
- Environmental justice: After TELC submitted a November 23, 2004 "notice of intent to sue" on behalf of St. James Citizens for Jobs and the Environment and the Louisiana Environmental Action Network, FTM and Associates, Inc. and LDEQ announced that FTM would stop its practice of spraying sewage sludge from Kenner, Louisiana, on sugar cane fields near the homes of residents of Convent, St. James Parish, Louisiana. Also, TELC intervened on behalf of Citizens for a Strong New Orleans East and others in a lawsuit to support a cease and desist order that shut down the Chef Menteur landfill, located between a lower-income Vietnamese-American community in East New Orleans and Bayou Sauvage National Wildlife Refuge.
- Rule of law: TELC's litigation on behalf of its clients includes cases to enforce the duty of Louisiana agencies, as public trustees under the Louisiana Constitution, to evaluate impacts, costs and benefits, alternatives, and mitigating measures before approving action affecting the environment. Also, on behalf of the Holy Cross Neighborhood Association and others, TELC prosecuted a case in which a federal court enjoined a $750 million U.S. Army Corps' project to expand the Industrial Canal in New Orleans' lower ninth ward after the Corps failed to comply with the National Environmental Policy Act. On behalf of Concerned Citizens Around Murphy, TELC worked with Public Justice to stop EPA from conducting an experimental burn of asbestos contaminated waste in St. Bernard Parish that would have violated EPA's own hazardous air pollutant regulations. TELC and Public Justice submitted a Notice of Intent to Sue the agency, alleging that EPA's plans to experiment by departing from health and safety standards would treat "a storm-devastated Louisiana parish as a laboratory for illegal experiments." In response, EPA dropped its plans to burn regulated asbestos containing material during the experiment.

== Funding ==
In addition to funding from Tulane Law School, TELC relies on donations by individuals, families and corporations, foundation grants, and attorney-fee recoveries.

== Controversy ==
Many of TELC's cases involve large corporations or issues of community, statewide, or national concern. For this reason, TELC's work on behalf of its clients can be controversial. John R. Kramer, the law school's dean at the time of TELC's inception, publicly defended TELC's work when it frustrated Louisiana chemical and oil companies during his tenure through 1996.

- Shintech & Rule XX Revisions: Tensions became especially pronounced in the late 1990s when TELC represented St. James Citizens for Jobs and the Environment, Louisiana Environmental Action Network, and others in opposing Shintech, Inc.'s proposal for a polyvinyl chloride plant in a predominantly African-American and lower income community in St. James Parish, Louisiana. In response to a petition that TELC and Greenpeace filed on May 22, 1997, EPA formally objected to a state-issued Clean Air Act permit for that plant on September 10, 1997. As a result, Shintech abandoned its plans for a facility in St. James Parish and built a smaller plant elsewhere in Louisiana. A cable-television movie called "Taking Back Our Town" tells the story of the St. James Citizens' victory in this case. The case sparked a backlash from some Louisiana politicians and members of the business community who asked the Louisiana Supreme Court to rein in TELC. The Court ultimately revised the student practice rule, although in a way that does not prevent TELC from representing clients in high impact or controversial cases.

Largely as a result of these events, the Times-Picayune has described TELC as the bane of former Governor Mike Foster and business groups. Even after EPA's objection to the polyvinyl chloride plant, however, Governor Foster met cordially with a TELC student attorney on Clean Water Act issues in January 2003.

- Senate Bill 549: On May 19, 2010, the Louisiana Senate Commerce, Consumer Protection, and International Affairs Committee killed proposed legislation intended to cripple TELC. Senator Robert Adley, R-Benton, introduced Senate Bill 549 at the Louisiana Chemical Association's (LCA's) request to try to force Tulane University to shut down TELC in return for continued state funding. Tulane and Loyola Universities, students, clients, and clinical faculty from across the state worked—with help from the Clinical Legal Education Association, the Society of American Law Teachers, the Association of American Law Schools, the Louisiana State Bar Association, the ABA, and many others—to educate lawmakers and others about clinics' role in legal education and expanding access to the legal system. At the May 19 hearing, Tulane University President Scott Cowen testified that if Tulane were to shut its clinics down to preserve state funding under Bill 549, "we throw under the bus every indigent person in this state … and say 'we will not represent you because the money is more important.' That does not happen in America." On May 24, 2010, New Orleans CityBusiness editorialized: "By attempting to snuff [TELC's] existence, Adley and the LCA were, in effect, thumbing their noses at the law, judicial process and regulation …. Lawmakers deserve commendation for helping the bill meet its demise." The Deepwater Horizon oil spill disaster became part of the atmosphere surrounding Adley's bill and its backing by the Louisiana Chemical Association and the Louisiana Oil and Gas Association and Cowen's remarks in opposition.

== Movies & TV ==
- The 2009 documentary "Abode" features footage of TELC student attorney Mary Nagle's November 8, 2007 oral argument before the Louisiana Public Service Commission in opposition to Entergy Louisiana, LLC's plan to increase emissions of global warming gasses at its Little Gypsy power plant in St. Charles Parish, Louisiana.
- NOW on PBS featured TELC's work in its July 15, 2005 episode, "Formula for Disaster."
- In Taking Back Our Town (Lifetime Television broadcast, Dec. 10, 2001), Myndy Crist plays TELC supervising attorney Lisa LaVie [Jordan] in a drama about a TELC case.
- Film producer and director Laura Dunn featured TELC's work in her 2000 documentary "Green."
- CBS's series 60 Minutes II featured TELC's work in its March 24, 2000 episode "Justice for Sale?"
- PBS's series Frontline featured TELC's work in its November 23, 1999, episode, "Justice for Sale"

== See also ==
- Tulane Environmental Law Journal
