= Michael R. Fontham =

American lawyer

- Citizenship: USA
- Known for: Book: Trial Technique and Evidence

Academic background
- Education: University of Virginia, Louisiana State University

Michael R. Fontham is a legal author, a law professor, and a practicing attorney and partner at the Stone Pigman law firm. He is the author of Trial Technique and Evidence and the lead author of Persuasive Written and Oral Advocacy: In Trial and Appellate Courts. He currently teaches as an adjunct professor of law at the Tulane University Law School and the Louisiana State University Schools of Law, and previously served as a visiting professor at the University of Virginia School of Law (1982–83). He served as an attorney to the late John G. Schwegmann, a pioneer in the development of the modern supermarket.

== Education ==
Fontham received his J.D. degree from the University of Virginia School of Law in 1971. He was selected to the Order of the Coif and was a member of the Virginia Law Review, 1969–71. He received his undergraduate degree from Louisiana State University in 1968.

== Awards ==
- Three-time recipient of the Monte Lemann Award at Tulane for distinguished teaching
- Recognized by the magazine The Best Lawyers in America
- Selected by "Chambers U.S.A. America's Leading Lawyers for Business" in the field of public utility law

== Books ==
- Trial Technique and Evidence
- Lead author of Persuasive Written and Oral Advocacy in Trial and Appellate Courts
