= Stéphanie Louise de Bourbon-Conti =

French author, musician, aristocrat and student of Jean-Jacques Rousseau

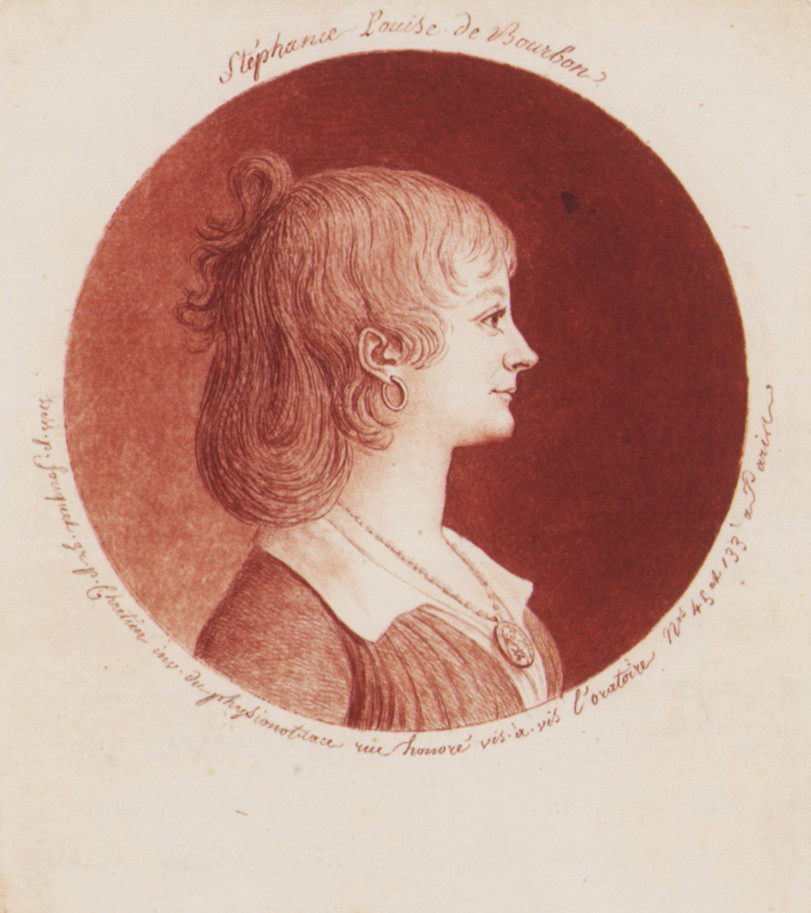
- Born: December 26, 1762; Paris
- Died: March 21, 1825 (aged 62); Orléans
- Other names: Amélie-Gabrielle Stéphanie Louise de Bourbon-Conti; Anne Louise Billet, Stephanie Louise de Bourbon, and Stephanie Louise de Montcairzain

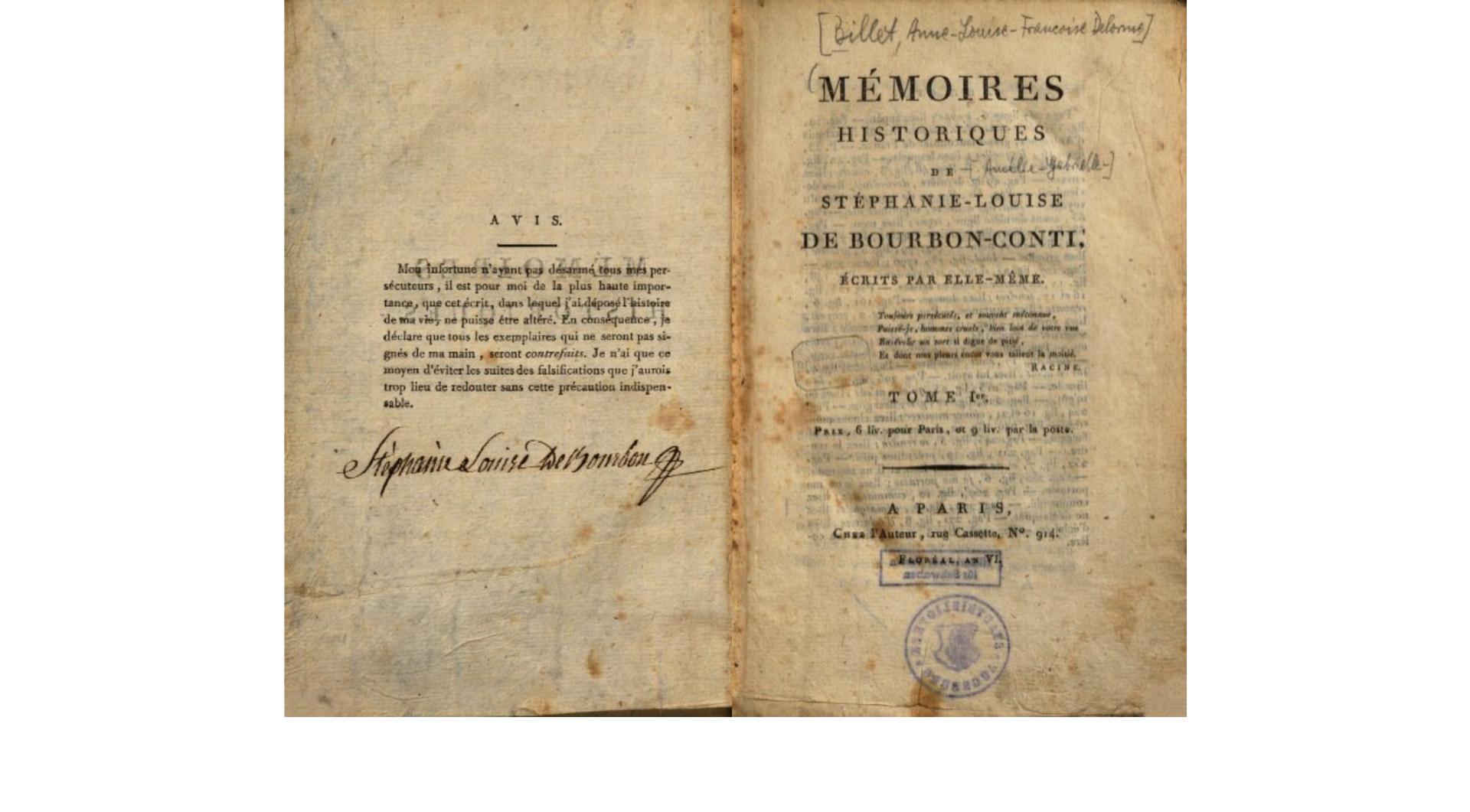
Mémoires historiques de Stéphanie-Louise de Bourbon-Conti (1797)

Stéphanie Louise de Bourbon-Conti (1762–1825), also known as Amélie-Gabrielle Stéphanie Louise de Bourbon-Conti, Anne Louise Billet, Stephanie Louise de Bourbon, and the Comtesse Stephanie Louise de Montcairzain, was a French author, musician, aristocrat and student of Jean-Jacques Rousseau. After the French Revolution, she owned a tobacco shop in Orléans. She published her memoirs, Mémoires historiques de Stéphanie-Louise de Bourbon-Conti in 1797, which include her observations of the French Revolution. This volume appeared in an English translation, published in New Bern, North Carolina, in 1801. She was buried at the Père Lachaise Cemetery in Paris.

== Early life and education ==
Stéphanie Louise de Bourbon-Conti was born in Paris on December 26, 1762, and was reportedly the "natural" or illegitimate daughter of Louis François de Bourbon, prince de Conti and Louise Jeanne de Durfort, duchesse de Mazarin. She received her education from Jean-Jacques Rousseau. He tutored her in military exercises, drawing, mathematics, music, Greek, Latin, and Italian. She composed music between 1766 and 1772 playing the violin, harp, flute, clarinet, piano, horn, and flageolet. In 1770, she attended the marriage of Marie Antoinette and the dauphin, Louis-Auguste, the future Louis XVI.

In a biographical study of Marie-Therese-Charlotte de France, Duchesse d'Angoulême and daughter of Louis XVI, which appeared in an English translation in 1908, the French historian Théodore Gosselin (writing under the pen name "G. Lenotre") cast doubt on Stéphanie Louise de Bourbon-Conti's claims to aristocratic status through paternity. Referring to her as the "self-styled Comtesse Stephanie Louise de Montcairzain," whose name Montcairzain she had contrived as a "anagrammatical patronymic," Gosselin wrote that "she was only able to offer the flimsiest of evidence in support of her claims to this exalted but irregular lineage." He added that since "1787 she had been wearying the Royal Family with her claims." He suggested that "to prove [her status] she would willingly have died on the scaffold" by guillotine during the Revolution, but that this distinction was denied to her on account of her spurious claims.

== Marriage, court life, and the French Revolution ==
Her mother forced her to marry a lawyer, Antoine Billet of Lons-le-Saunier, in January 1774, when she was eleven years old. After twelve years in an abusive marriage, she escaped. She took refuge in the royal abbey of Meaux where Louis, comte de Provence (future king of France Louis XVIII) offered protection. Louis XVI eventually recognized her as a relative and granted her a pension. She was in the king's company during the besieging of the Tuileries Palace on August 10, 1792. In 1795, she secured permission to visit her cousin Marie-Thérèse, daughter of Louis XVI and Marie-Antoinette, in prison. Having lost her fortune during the Revolution, she eventually became a shopkeeper in Orléans, where she sold tobacco.

She published her memoirs in French in 1797. An English translation appeared in the United States in 1801, probably under the aegis of the lawyer, judge, and author François Xavier Martin, who was born in Marseille and who emigrated first to Martinique in 1780, and later to New Bern, North Carolina, where he established a print shop.
