= Ferdinand Stone =

American jurist (1908–1989)

Ferdinand Fairfax Stone (December 12, 1908 – June 10, 1989) was an American law professor at Tulane University Law School.

A native of Urbana, Ohio, he graduated from Ohio State University, where he obtained both a bachelor's and master's degree before attending Oxford University in England as a Rhodes Scholar. He obtained two bachelor's and one master's degrees from Oxford, as well as a doctorate from Yale University.

Stone was the author of many books and articles in comparative law in French and English. One of his textbooks on American law was the first published in French.

In addition to his teaching duties, while an active member of Tulane's faculty from 1937 to 1978, as a visiting professor in other institutions and as the W. R. Irby Professor Emeritus after retiring, in 1949 he founded and headed until 1979 Tulane's Institute of Comparative Law, served on the Board of Editors of the American Journal of Comparative Law, a member of the International Academy of Comparative Law and a director of the Society for Comparative Study of Law.

== Honors and recognitions ==
- Rhodes Scholar, Oxford University
- Sterling Fellow, Yale University
- W. R. Irby Professor Emeritus, Tulane University
- Order of the British Empire
- Honorary Degree, Université de Grenoble
- Ferdinand Fairfax Stone Scholarship, Tulane University School of Law
- Ferdinand F. Stone Graduate Fellowship, Tulane University

== Publications ==
- Common Problems and Uncommon Solutions in the Law of Torts, 2 Ga. L. Rev. 145
