= Eligius Fromentin =

American politician (1767–1822)

- Eligius Fromentin naturalization record, 1798

United States Judge for West Florida
- In office May 18, 1821 – June 4, 1822
- Preceded by: None (position created)
- Succeeded by: Henry Marie Brackenridge

Judge of the New Orleans Criminal Court
- In office April 1821 – May 1821
- Preceded by: William O. Winston
- Succeeded by: Fielding Turner

United States Senator from Louisiana
- In office March 4, 1813 – March 3, 1819
- Preceded by: Allan B. Magruder
- Succeeded by: James Brown

Personal details
- Born: 1767 France
- Died: October 6, 1822 (aged 54–55) New Orleans, Louisiana, US
- Resting place: Saint Louis Cemetery Number 1, New Orleans, Louisiana, US
- Party: Democratic-Republican
- Spouse: Elizabeth Polk
- Occupation: Attorney

Eligius Fromentin (1767 – October 6, 1822) was a French priest who became an American politician. He served as secretary of Louisiana's territorial legislature, and at the constitutional convention that led to its admission to the Union. He was a US senator from 1813 to 1819 and a federal judge in West Florida from 1821 to 1822.

== Early life ==
Fromentin was born and raised in France, where he completed his education and became a Jesuit Roman Catholic priest. Fromentin fled the country during the French Revolution's Reign of Terror in the early 1790s and settled in the United States. Fromentin lived first in Pennsylvania, where he became a naturalized US citizen and later in Maryland, where he was a schoolteacher and priest.

By the early 1800s, Fromentin decided to leave the church and moved to Louisiana, which was being purchased by the United States. He settled in New Orleans in 1803, studied law, and attained admission to the bar.

== Political career ==
Fromentin was clerk of the territorial house of representatives from 1807 to 1811. He was a delegate to the constitutional convention that developed Louisiana's state constitution when it joined the Union in 1812. From 1812 to 1813, he was secretary of the Louisiana State Senate. In 1813, he was elected to the United States Senate and he served one term, March 4, 1813, to March 3, 1919. Fromentin was likely the first former priest to serve in Congress. In 1814, he was elected to the American Antiquarian Society.

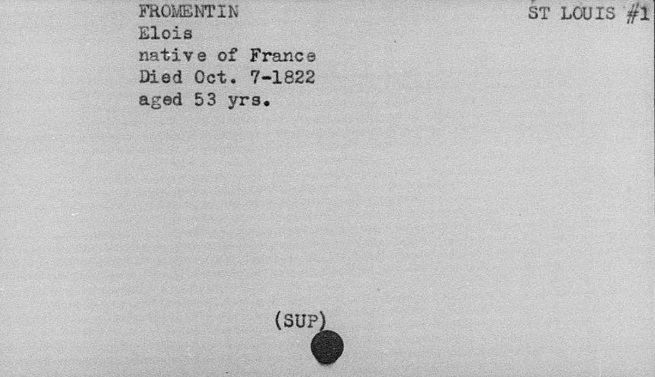
Burial record for Eligius Fromentin. Despite the spelling of the first name, the date of burial makes it clear this record is for Eligius Fromentin.

After leaving the senate, Fromentin returned to Louisiana, where he practiced law and was appointed a judge of the New Orleans criminal court in 1821. He soon left this position to become a federal judge for West Florida after being appointed by James Monroe.

As a judge, Fromentin engaged in a prolonged feud conflict with Andrew Jackson, the Territorial Governor, with Jackson arresting José María Callava, the former Spanish Governor, whom he accused of attempting to flee to Cuba with Spanish documents related to West Florida. Fromentin issued a habeas corpus writ for Callava, which Jackson refused to honor.

After resigning his judgeship in June 1822, Fromentin returned to New Orleans to practice law. He became ill during a Yellow Fever epidemic later that year, and he died in New Orleans on October 6, 1822. He was married to Elizabeth Polk of Maryland, with whom he had no children. She died of Yellow Fever the day before Fromentin. The Fromentins were buried at Saint Louis Cemetery Number 1 in New Orleans.

== Support for slavery ==
Fromentin was a supporter of slavery. In addition to owning slaves himself, his political activity included arguing against an effort to annex Louisiana Territory to Indiana Territory on the grounds that slavery was banned in Indiana, and so might become banned in Louisiana.

== See also ==
- List of United States senators born outside the United States

U.S. Senate
Preceded by Allan B. Magruder	U.S. senator (Class 3) from Louisiana; 1813–1819; Served alongside: James Brown, William C.C. Claiborne, Henry Johnson	Succeeded by James Brown
