= Tulane Environmental Law Journal =

- Discipline: Environmental law
- Language: English

Publication details
- History: 1988 to present
- Publisher: Tulane University Law School (USA)
- Frequency: Semiannual
- Impact factor: 0.28

Standard abbreviations
- Bluebook: Tul. Envtl. L.J.
- ISO 4: Tulane Environ. Law J.

Links
- Journal homepage

The Tulane Environmental Law Journal (TELJ) is a legal periodical produced and edited by students at the Tulane University Law School. The journal has been recognized as among the top fifteen environmental law journals. Articles are written by professors, practitioners, and Tulane Law students. It was founded in 1988. Adam Babich serves as the Journal's faculty adviser. Oliver Houck serves as faculty adviser emeritus.

== Distinguished alumni ==
- Mona M. Stone, JD 1997, Chicago partner of Locke Lord Bissell & Liddell; former Business Editor of the Journal
- Trilby Robinson–Dorn, JD 1997, Seattle partner of K&L Gates; former Editor in Chief of the Journal

== See also ==
- Tulane Environmental Law Clinic
