= Allan B. Magruder =

United States Senator from Louisiana

Allan Bowie Magruder

United States Senator from Louisiana
- In office September 3, 1812 – March 3, 1813
- Preceded by: Seat established
- Succeeded by: Eligius Fromentin

Personal details
- Born: c. 1775 Virginia or Kentucky
- Died: April 16, 1822 (aged 47) Opelousas, Louisiana, US
- Party: Democratic-Republican
- Occupation: Poet, historian, lawyer, politician

Allan Bowie Magruder (c. 1775 – April 16, 1822) was an American poet, historian, lawyer, and politician, who served as a United States Senator from Louisiana from September 3, 1812, to March 3, 1813.

== Early life ==
Allan Bowie Magruder was born in either Virginia or Kentucky in 1775, the son of George Frazer Magruder and Eleanor Bowie. George Frazer Magruder was a great-grandson of Alexander Magruder, a Scotsman who immigrated to Maryland as an indentured servant after being captured in the Battle of Worcester. The Magruder surname has been spelled various ways. Allan pursued an academic course in the common schools of Kentucky, and then studied law. In 1791, Allan requested Secretary of State Thomas Jefferson’s help in obtaining a clerkship in the War Treasury Department. Allan was admitted to the bar in 1796 or 1797 in Lexington, Kentucky, where he practiced law.

== Early literary career ==
Magruder was one of Kentucky’s first poets, and his poetry was published in the Kentucky Gazette from 1802 to 1803. His poetry attracted attention in the Western United States. No more than three or four of his poems survive.

Magruder, also a historian, wrote an essay titled The Character of Thomas Jefferson in 1800, first appearing in the Kentucky Gazette. It was widely reprinted, and, in 1803, reappeared in a Kentucky periodical called The Medley. Magruder authored a 150-page volume titled Reflections on the Late Cessions of Louisiana to the United States in 1803. In his work, which he dedicated to President Jefferson, Magruder “described the political, agricultural, and commercial advantages of Louisiana,” and the future of the newly acquired territory's economic development. Some views Magruder expressed in his work include the relocation of Native Americans, as well as the colonization of freed African-Americans. In his work, Magruder also expressed his belief that Cuba would one day be under the control of the United States. Magruder sent his work to Jefferson, as evidenced by a letter he wrote to him before February 7, 1804:

From Allan B. Magruder

Lexington, Kentucky—[before 7 Feb. 1804]

Sir,

It is with great diffidence that I have taken the liberty to send you a Series of Reflections on the late Cession of Louisiana, to the United States. They were digested and Commited to paper, last Summer, during the pendancy of that Negociation of Which, you are the parent; & Which, in its Ultimate issue, has added the most important advantages to our Country.—

Be so obliging, therefore, as to accept the pamphlet, Which I have the honor to send you. It is a Small testimony of the Sincere devotion I feel for an administration, Which, in every respect, Comports with the true genius & felicity of the American Nation.—

I am, Sir, with great respect, your mo: Ob Sevt

Allan B. Magruder

Magruder next considered the possibility of writing a history of the Indian Wars. His book plan was highly publicized, and Magruder obtained material for the work. Magruder and President Jefferson are known to have corresponded on this subject. Simultaneously, Magruder also considered writing, and collected material for, a history of Kentucky. Magruder also considered writing a biography of George Rogers Clark.

== End of literary career and early political career ==
Magruder's earlier essay on Thomas Jefferson likely caused Jefferson, as president, to appoint Magruder Commissioner of Lands in Orleans Territory, now Louisiana, in July 1805. However, this caused Magruder, in August, to suspend his research on his three most recent literary projects, which would remain unfinished. Magruder chose to turn over his material for his history of Kentucky to his friend, John Bradford, who used them to write Notes on Kentucky. Magruder relocated to Opelousas, Louisiana, in St. Landry Parish, in order to fulfill his new government job. As a federal agent, Magruder investigated land claims in Louisiana, but was dismissed in 1806, possibly as a result of intemperance.

In 1806, the Kentucky Gazette printed Magruder's observations on Native American battles, ceremonial customs, religion, likely drawn from his earlier research on the subject of the Indian Wars.

When Magruder was not involved in politics in Louisiana, he practiced law.

Eventually, Magruder was elected to the Louisiana House of Representatives. In 1811, Magruder was elected to be a delegate to the Louisiana Constitutional Convention. He chaired the committee tasked to write the state's constitution. The constitution was modeled after the Constitution of Kentucky, Magruder's home state, however, a Bill of Rights was excluded, the law system was based on civil law, and instead of counties, the state was divided in parishes. The constitution was drafted on January 22, 1812, and Louisiana became a state on April 30, 1812. Magruder was chosen as one of two agents to exhibit the constitution to President James Madison.

== U.S. Senate (1812-1813) ==
In September 1812, Magruder, a Democratic-Republican, receiving 21 votes, was elected by the Louisiana State Legislature to be one of Louisiana's first two United States Senators in the 12th United States Congress along with Jean Noel Destrehan. They took office on September 3, 1812. Magruder served as a United States Senator from Louisiana from September 3, 1812, to March 3, 1813. Lots were drawn to determine the class assignments of the new Senators on November 27, 1812, and Magruder was assigned to Class 1, although he would later be designated as a Class 3 Senator. As a result of his class assignment, Magruder served a six-month term in the United States Senate, set to expire on March 3, 1813. In 1812, Magruder voted to increase the navy, and to inquire into the expediency of taking East Florida. In 1813, Magruder voted to better organize the army, to confirm the appointment of John Armstrong to be Secretary of War, to withdraw troops from South Florida (the measure failed), to confirm the appointment of William Henry Harrison as Major General, and to again increase the navy. In total, Magruder missed 25 out of 89 roll call votes in the senate, which translates to him missing 28.1% of roll call votes. Magruder's roll call absence is considered to be much worse than the average lifetime percentage, 14.9%, of roll call votes missed by senators serving when Magruder left office. Magruder is one of 45 U.S. Senators not represented in the Senate Historical Office Photo Collection. Magruder left office as a United States Senator from Louisiana on March 3, 1813, after serving a six-month term. He was succeeded by Eligius Fromentin.

== Later life ==
After his six-month tenure in the Senate, Magruder resumed the practice of law in Louisiana. For the rest of his life, Magruder did not write any more scholarly works. Magruder is not known to have been married, or to have had issue. Magruder was a slave owner. Magruder died in Opelousas, Louisiana, aged 47, on April 16, 1822. In Kentucky in American Letters, author John Wilson Townsend hails Magruder as “a man of high culture and of high promise.”

U.S. Senate
Preceded by New seat	U.S. senator (Class 3) from Louisiana; 1812–1813; Served alongside: Jean N. Destréhan, Thomas Posey, James Brown	Succeeded by Eligius Fromentin
