= Robert Ashford =

American academic

Robert Ashford is Professor of Law at the Syracuse University College of Law, in Syracuse, New York. He teaches subjects including Binary Economics, Business Associations, Corporations, Securities Regulation and Professional Responsibility.

== Education ==
Professor Ashford holds a J.D. with honors from Harvard Law School. He also holds a B.A. with majors in physics and English literature from the University of South Florida, where he graduated first in his class. As a Woodrow Wilson Fellow at Stanford University, he studied creative writing and English literature.

"Professor Ashford is the founder and principal organizer of the Section on Socio-Economics of the Association of American Law Schools and a member of the Editorial Board of the Journal of Socio-Economics, the academic honor societies of Phi Kappa Phi and Sigma Pi Sigma (physics), and the American Law Institute."

== Publications ==
- Binary Economics: the New Paradigm, with Rodney Shakespeare (University Press of America, 1999).
- Socio-Economics" Encyclopedia of Law and Society, (Sage Publications, 2007).
- "Binary Economics" Encyclopedia of Law and Society, (Sage Publications, 2007)
- Binary Economics, Fiduciary Duties, and Corporate Social Responsibility: Comprehending Corporate Wealth Maximization and Distribution for Stockholders, Stakeholders, and Society, 76 Tul. L. Rev. 5 (2002).

Robert Ashford is also an accomplished composer of contemporary classical music.
