= Citizen suit =

Lawsuit by a private citizen to enforce a statute

In the United States, a citizen suit is a lawsuit by a private citizen to enforce a statute.

Citizen suits come in three forms. First, a private citizen can bring a lawsuit against a citizen, corporation, or government body for engaging in conduct prohibited by the statute. For example, a citizen can sue a corporation under the Clean Water Act (CWA) for illegally polluting a waterway. Second, a private citizen can bring a lawsuit against a government body for failing to perform a non-discretionary duty. For example, a private citizen could sue the Environmental Protection Agency for failing to promulgate regulations that the CWA required it to promulgate. In a third, less common form, citizens may sue for an injunction to abate a potential imminent and substantial endangerment involving generation, disposal or handling of waste, regardless of whether or not the defendant's conduct violates a statutory prohibition. This third type of citizen suit is analogous to the common law tort of public nuisance. In general, the law entitles plaintiffs who bring successful citizen suits to recover reasonable attorney fees and other litigation costs.

In 1970, when amending the Clean Air Act, the United States Congress was inspired by similar legislation in the civil rights arena to begin including specific provisions for citizens to bring suit against violators or government agencies to enforce environmental laws. Today, most anti-pollution laws have provisions for citizen suits and they have become a major means of ensuring compliance with environmental laws. Public-interest environmental legal service organizations, such as Earthjustice and the Tulane Environmental Law Clinic, often prosecute citizen suits. Some non-environmental statutes, such as the Americans with Disabilities Act and the Fair Housing Amendments Act, also contain citizen suit provisions, but the majority of regulatory statutes do not.

One of the limitations on the right of citizens to bring environmental lawsuits is a 60-day prior notice of the alleged violations to the alleged violator. In 1989, the United States Supreme Court held that such notice and the 60-day delay are "mandatory conditions precedent to commencing suit." Further, citizens may only bring citizen suits in federal court if they have "standing to sue". To establish standing, the courts have required proof of three elements. First, the plaintiff must have suffered an “injury in fact”—an invasion of a legally protected interest which is (a) concrete and particularized and (b) “actual or imminent, not ‘conjectural’ or ‘hypothetical’”. Second, there must be a causal connection between the injury and the conduct complained of—the injury has to be "fairly ... trace[able] to the challenged action of the defendant, and not ... th[e] result [of] the independent action of some third party not before the court." Third, it must be "likely", as opposed to merely "speculative", that the injury will be "redressed by a favorable decision."

Environmental laws that allow citizen suits include:

- Clean Water Act
- Safe Drinking Water Act
- Clean Air Act 1970
- Resource Conservation and Recovery Act
- Comprehensive Environmental Response, Compensation, and Liability Act
- Surface Mining Control and Reclamation Act of 1977
- Endangered Species Act of 1973
- Emergency Planning and Community Right To Know Act of 1986- SARA Title III

Citizens suits can increase selective prosecution.

== See also ==
- Money trail
- Occupy movement
- Regulatory capture
- Qui tam
- Cause of action
- Private prosecution
- Private attorney general
- Whole Woman's Health v. Jackson
