= Tulane Journal of Law & Sexuality =

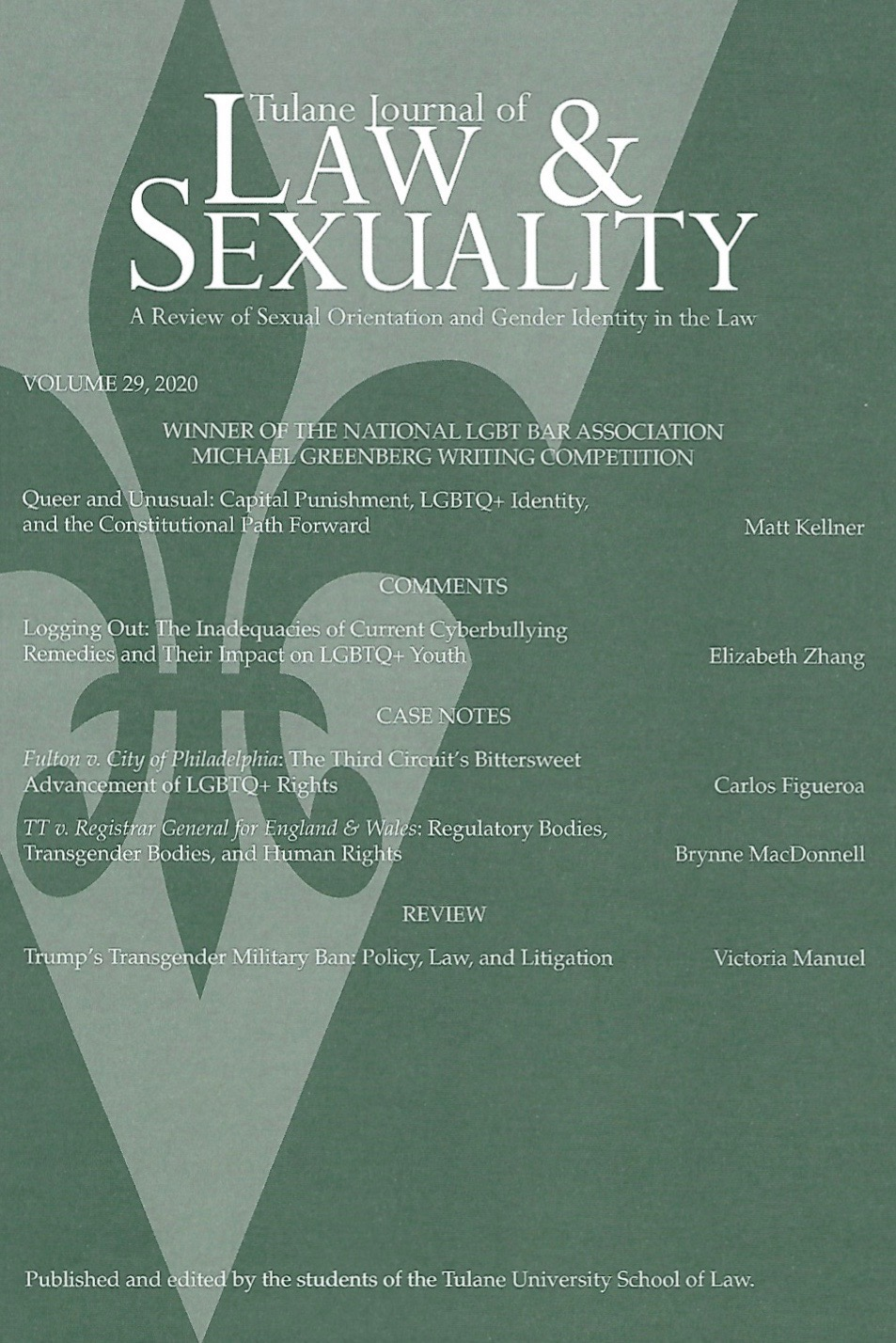
- Volume 29 cover (2020)
- Discipline: Sex and the law
- Language: English
- Edited by: Editha Rosario

Publication details
- Former names: Law & Sexuality
- History: 1991–present
- Publisher: Tulane University Law School (United States)
- Frequency: Annual

Standard abbreviations
- Bluebook: Tul. J. L. & Sex.
- ISO 4: Tulane J. Law Sex.

Indexing
- ISSN: 1062-0680
- LCCN: 93649001
- OCLC no.: 47173063

Links
- Journal homepage

The Tulane Journal of Law & Sexuality is a student-edited law review published by Tulane University Law School, and is the official law journal for the National LGBT Bar Association. It was the first law journal to solely discuss legal issues concerning the LGBTQ+ community in the United States, and continues to publish the winning article of the annual Michael Greenberg Writing Competition. The journal has published works involving constitutional, employment, family, healthcare, insurance and military law among other topics intersecting with sexuality.

== History and membership ==
The journal was established in 1991 as Law & Sexuality: A Review of Lesbian and Gay Legal Issues, becoming the first legal publication dedicated solely to analysis of LGBTQ+ issues. In 1997, its title was amended to Law & Sexuality: A Review of Lesbian, Gay, Bisexual and Transgender Legal Issues. In 2012, the journal obtained its current title, Tulane Journal of Law & Sexuality: A Review of Sexual Orientation and Gender Identity in the Law.

Members are chosen through writing competitions conducted annually in the summer and fall. Members agree to either a one or two-year commitment based on their graduation date.

== Notable articles ==
The following articles have been cited most often:

- Nan D. Hunter, Marriage, Law, and Gender: A Feminist Inquiry, 1 Tul. J. L. & Sex. 9 (1991).
- Gary David Comstock, Dismantling the Homosexual Panic Defense, 2 Tul. J. L. & Sex. 81 (1992).
- Darren Rosenblum, Queer Intersectionality and the Failure of Recent Lesbian and Gay "Victories", 4 Tul. J. L. & Sex. 83 (1994).
- Laurie Rose Kepros, Queer Theory: Weed or Seed in the Garden of Legal Theory, 9 Tul. J. L. & Sex. 279 (2000).
- Jillian Todd Weiss, The Gender Caste System: Identity, Privacy, and Heteronormativity, 10 Tul. J. L. & Sex. 123 (2001).
- Cece Cox, To Have and to Hold - Or Not: The Influence of the Christian Right on Gay Marriage Laws in the Netherlands, Canada, and the United States, 14 Tul. J. L. & Sex. 1 (2005).
- Rebecca Mann, The Treatment of Transgender Prisoners, Not Just an American Problem - A Comparative Analysis of American, Australian, and Canadian Prison Policies Concerning the Treatment of Transgender Prisoners and a Universal Recommendation to Improve Treatment, 15 Tul. J. L. & Sex. 91 (2006).
- Ummni Khan, A Woman's Right to Be Spanked: Testing the Limits of Tolerance of SM in the Socio-Legal Imaginary, 18 Tul. J. L. & Sex. 79 (2009).
- Annette Houlihan, When "No" Means "Yes" and "Yes" Means Harm: HIV Risk, Consent and Sadomasochism Case Law, 20 Tul. J. L. & Sex. 31 (2011).
- Maura McNamara, Better to Be Out in Prison Than out in Public: LGBTQ Prisoners Receive More Constitutional Protection if They Are Open About Their Sexuality While in Prison, 23 Law & Sexuality: Rev. Lesbian, Gay, Bisexual and Transgender Legal Issues 135 (2014).
- Alexandra Brandes, The Negative Effect of Stigma, Discrimination, and the health Care System on the Health of Gender and Sexual Minorities, 23 Tul. J. L. & Sex. 155 (2014).
- Aeyal Gross, Rape by Deception and the Policing of Gender and Nationality Borders, 24 Tul. J. L. & Sex. 1 (2015).
- Deborah Lolai, You're Going to Be Straight or You're Not Going to Live Here: Child Support for LGBT Homeless Youth, 24 Tul. J. L. & Sex. 35 (2015).
- Michael J. Griffin, Intersecting Intersectionalities and the Failure of the Law to Protect Transgender Women of Color in the United States, 25 Tul. J. L. & Sex. 123 (2016).
- Alexandra Masri, Equal Rights, Unequal Protection: Institutional Failures in Protecting and Advocating for Victims of Same-Sex Domestic Violence in Post-Marriage Equality Era, 27 Tul. J. L. & Sex. 75 (2018).
- James Hampton, Homosexuality: An Aggravating Factor, 28 Tul. J. L. & Sex. 25 (2019).

== The Michael Greenberg Writing Competition ==
Michael Greenberg was a former member of the National LGBT Bar Association and a Philadelphia attorney who died in 1996 from AIDS complications. The competition was created in his memory, and recognizes exceptional student legal scholarship concerning the LGBTQ+ community. The Tulane Journal of Law & Sexuality selects a winner and runner-up eligible for cash prizes and free registration to the annual Lavender Law Conference and Career Fair. Each winner and submission are reviewed for potential publication in the journal.

Recent winners:

- Cassidy Duckett (2020), Temple University Beasley School of Law, "Downtowns and Diverted Dollars: How the Metronormativity Narrative Damages Rural Queer Political Organizing."
- Matt Kellner (2019), Yale Law School, "Queer and Unusual: Capital Punishment, LGBTQ Identity, and the Constitutional Path Forward."
- Emily Lamm (2018), Vanderbilt Law School, "Bye, Bye, Binary: Updating Birth Certificates to Transcend the Binary of Sex."
- Sarah Capasso-Kosan (2017), Brooklyn Law School, "A Proposal for the First National Equality Tax Credit Act."
- Elizabeth B. Booker (2016), University of Memphis School of Law, "The ADA's Exclusion of Gender Dysphoria: An Analysis of the Rift Between Jurisprudence and Mental Health."

== See also ==
- LGBT rights in the United States
- LGBT rights by country or territory
- National LGBT Bar Association
