= Tulane European and Civil Law Forum =

- Discipline: Civil law; European law
- Language: English

Publication details
- Publisher: Tulane University Law School (USA)
- Frequency: Annual

Standard abbreviations
- Bluebook: Tul. Eur. & Civ. L.F.
- ISO 4: Tulane Eur. Civ. Law Forum

Links
- Journal homepage

The Tulane European & Civil Law is a predominantly faculty-run law journal published out of the Tulane University Law School. The Journal's Board of Contributing Editors is made up of 51 scholars from ten European countries and the United States.

== Rankings ==
The Journal has been ranked #2 out of 18 peer-edited law journals in the world, and #1 out of 3 European Law peer-edited journals in the United States.
