= Tulane Maritime Law Journal =

- Discipline: Maritime law
- Language: English

Publication details
- History: 1975–present
- Publisher: Tulane University Law School (USA)
- Frequency: Semiannual

Standard abbreviations
- Bluebook: Tul. Mar. L.J.
- ISO 4: Tulane Marit. Law J.

Indexing
- ISSN: 1048-3748

Links
- Journal homepage

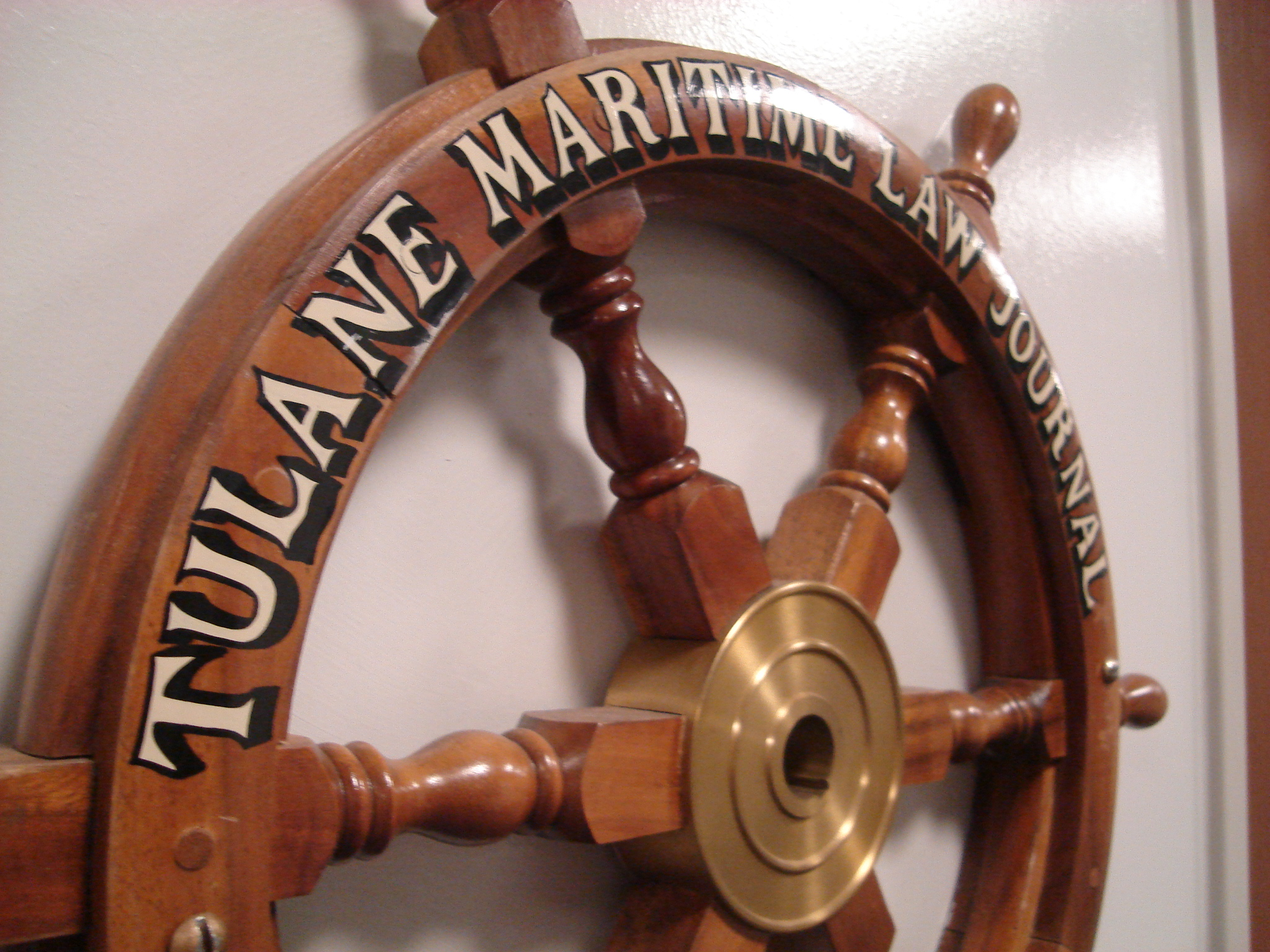
The Tulane Maritime Law Journal ship steering wheel adorns the entrance to the journal's student offices in Weinmann Hall.

The Tulane Maritime Law Journal is the preeminent student-edited law journal in the field of Admiralty and Maritime Law. Published semi-annually, each issue of the Journal includes scholarly works written by academics, practitioners, and students concerning current topics in Admiralty and Maritime Law. In addition, the Journal publishes an annual section on Recent Developments in Admiralty and Maritime Law for the United States and the international community, as well as periodic symposia on relevant topical areas in the field and quantum, collision, and forum selection clause surveys every other year.

The Tulane Maritime Law Journal launched a new website on August 28, 2013.

== Articles ==
The Journal has been cited by the U.S. Supreme Court many times—most recently, in 2010. The Court also cited the Journal in 2009, when it relied, in part, on an article by New York maritime attorney Paul S. Edelman (Guevara v. Maritime Overseas Corp., 20 Tul. Mar. L. J. 349 (1996)).

== History ==
The Tulane Maritime Law Journal was founded in 1973 in conjunction with the student-run Tulane Maritime Law Society. The first issue of the Journal was released in March 1975 as The Maritime Lawyer. The next few years were formative and interesting times for the Journal, a history that is retraced in the 20th Anniversary issue (Volume 20, Issue 1). In the fall of 1977, the Journal established its independence from the Tulane Maritime Law Society. Since that fall, the Journal has been published every winter and summer. Starting with Volume 12, in 1987, the publication changed its name from The Maritime Lawyer to the Tulane Maritime Law Journal. The name change was to better reflect the Journal's status as a student-edited law journal.

== See also ==
- Admiralty law
- International law
- Tulane University Law School
