= James Brown (Louisiana politician) =

American lawyer, planter, diplomat and politician (1766–1835)

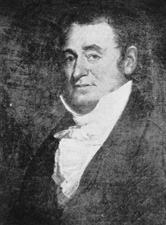

12th United States Minister to France
- In office April 13, 1824 – June 28, 1829
- Appointed by: James Monroe
- Preceded by: Albert Gallatin
- Succeeded by: William Cabell Rives

United States Senator from Louisiana
- In office February 5, 1813 – March 3, 1817
- Preceded by: Thomas Posey
- Succeeded by: William C. C. Claiborne
- In office March 4, 1819 – December 10, 1823
- Preceded by: Eligius Fromentin
- Succeeded by: Josiah S. Johnston

1st Secretary of State of Kentucky
- In office June 5, 1792 – October 13, 1796
- Governor: Isaac Shelby
- Preceded by: New office
- Succeeded by: Harry Toulmin

Personal details
- Born: September 11, 1766 Staunton, Virginia
- Died: April 7, 1835 (aged 68) Philadelphia, Pennsylvania, US
- Party: Democratic-Republican
- Spouse: Ann "Nancy" Hart
- Education: Washington and Lee University; College of William & Mary

James Brown (September 11, 1766 – April 7, 1835) was an American lawyer, planter, diplomat and politician who served as a Secretary of State for the new state of Kentucky, and later as U.S. Senator from Louisiana, and Minister to France (1823–1829) before his retirement and death in Philadelphia.

== Early and family life ==
Born near Staunton, Virginia, to John Brown and his wife, young James Brown had brothers John and Samuel Brown and sisters Mary and Elizabeth who either survived him or had children who survived him, unlike his brother Preston. His brother John Brown became the U.S. Senator from Kentucky and active in its gaining statehood. Well-connected among the southern elite, they were also cousins of John Breckinridge, James Breckinridge and Francis Preston.

James Brown attended Washington College (later Washington and Lee University) in Lexington, Virginia, and the College of William & Mary in Williamsburg. James Brown read law, was admitted to the Virginia bar, and commenced practice in Frankfort, Kentucky, then still part of Virginia.

He married Ann "Nancy" Hart, one of seven children of Revolutionary War veteran and successful businessman Col. Thomas Hart, who moved from North Carolina to Maryland and finally Lexington, Kentucky. Her sister Lucretia married Henry Clay, who became U.S. Senator from Kentucky. Her brother Nathaniel G. S. Hart died in the War of 1812. They did not have any children who survived them. James Brown was the uncle of James Brown Clay, Henry Clay, Jr., John Morrison Clay, the great-uncle of B. Gratz Brown, and the cousin-in-law of Thomas Hart Benton.

== Career ==
James Brown commanded a company of Virginia sharpshooters in an expedition against Native Americans in 1789. He served as secretary to Isaac Shelby, the first governor of Kentucky, in 1792. On June 5, 1792, Shelby nominated Brown as Secretary of State; he was confirmed by the state senate and served until October 13, 1796.

Soon after the United States made the Louisiana Purchase, Brown moved to New Orleans, where he was appointed in 1804 as secretary of the Territory of Orleans. He served from October 1 to December 11 of that year, when he was appointed as U.S. Attorney-General for the Territory.

Brown became one of the wealthiest planters and slave owners on the German Coast. His extensive plantation produced sugar through the use of slave labor.

In January 1811, some slaves from James Brown's plantations (some of them jointly owned by his nephew James Humphreys) joined in the 1811 German Coast uprising. One was the African-born warrior Kook, who became one of the insurrection's leaders. It was the largest slave rebellion in U.S. history, but was soon suppressed. The insurgents killed only two white men, but between the one battle, subsequent summary executions by militia members, and executions after tribunals of slaveowners, ninety-five black men died. Some of the men were from Saint-Domingue, brought to Spanish Louisiana several years earlier by white French refugees, as well as by refugee gens de couleur (free people of colour), who fled the violence and expropriations of the Haitian Revolution. Others were slaves imported directly from Africa.

Brown was elected as a Democratic Republican to the United States Senate on December 1, 1812, to fill the vacancy caused by the resignation of Jean Noël Destréhan, whose slaves were also involved in the quashed uprising. Brown served in the U.S. Senate from February 5, 1813, until March 3, 1817. The Louisiana legislature refused to reelect him, but in 1819 he was elected again to the U.S. Senate as a Democratic-Republican aligned with Southern Jeffersonians. During the Missouri Crisis, he favored the unrestricted expansion of slavery west of the Mississippi River. He served from March 4, 1819, until December 10, 1823, when he resigned. During his tenure, Brown was the chairman, Committee on Foreign Relations (Sixteenth Congress).

With the consent of the Senate, the President appointed Brown U.S. Minister to France, and he served 1823–1829. Returning to the U.S., he settled in Philadelphia, Pennsylvania. He agreed to support a Quaker appeal for funds to aid an American free black settlement in Ontario, Canada, known as the Wilberforce Colony. It had been started by free blacks from Cincinnati, Ohio, who emigrated to Canada in reaction to discriminatory laws and especially a highly destructive riot against them in 1829.

Brown was elected a member of the American Antiquarian Society in 1814 and the American Philosophical Society in 1827.

== Death and legacy ==
Brown survived his wife Nancy, as well as a Philadelphia cholera outbreak in 1831, but died in Philadelphia in 1835. After a service at its St. Stephen's Church, he was buried in the vault of nearby Christ Church, Philadelphia.

Brown is remembered as one of the drafters of the first Louisiana Civil Code of 1808, a work undertaken together with Louis Moreau-Lislet and Edward Livingston.

== Citations ==
- "Secretary of State James Brown". Kentucky Secretary of State. Archived from the original on November 4, 2010.

U.S. Senate
Preceded by Thomas Posey	U.S. senator (Class 2) from Louisiana; 1813–1817; Served alongside: Allan B. Magruder, Eligius Fromentin	Succeeded by William C.C. Claiborne
Preceded by Eligius Fromentin	U.S. senator (Class 3) from Louisiana; 1819–1823; Served alongside: Henry Johnson	Succeeded by Josiah S. Johnston
Diplomatic posts
Preceded by Albert Gallatin	United States Minister to France; 1824–1829	Succeeded by William C. Rives
Political offices
Preceded by established	Secretary of State of Kentucky; 1792–1796	Succeeded by Harry Toulmin
