= Civil Law Commentaries =

- Discipline: Civil law
- Language: English

Publication details
- History: 2008-present
- Publisher: Tulane University Law School (United States)
- Frequency: Annual

Standard abbreviations
- ISO 4: Civ. Law Comment.

Links
- Journal homepage

Civil Law Commentaries is an open access publication of the Eason-Weinmann Center for Comparative Law at the Tulane University Law School. It is published online annually, and is a student-edited publication dedicated to the study of the Louisiana Civil Code and the state's long civilian tradition.

Civil Law Commentaries publishes articles by law professors, judges, attorneys, and students on private law and comparative law topics, favoring those related to Louisiana law and legal history. The journal also publishes book reviews, notes, comments, and English translations of legal works.

== Advisors and editors ==
- A. N. Yiannopoulos, editor emeritus
- Brandon Thibodeaux, editor in chief, 2008–09
- Francisco A. Besosa-Martinez, editor in chief, 2009–10
