= Louis Moreau-Lislet =

American translator

- Born: October 7, 1766; Dondon, Saint-Domingue
- Died: December 3, 1832 (aged 66); New Orleans, Louisiana, U.S.
- Occupation: Jurist
- Known for: Louisiana Civil Code

Louis Moreau-Lislet (Dondon, 7 October 1766 – New Orleans, 3 December 1832) was an American jurist and translator.

He is considered one of the fathers of the Louisiana Civil Code, which he drafted together with James Brown and Edward Livingston. Further, he served as Attorney General of the then Territory of Orleans.

== Bibliography ==
- Old Families of Louisiana, par Stanley Clisby, Arthur, George Campbell, et Huchet de Kernion
