= Sally Miller =

German immigrant to the US, then enslaved, and freed in 1845

Sally Miller, supposedly born Salomé Müller (c. 1814 – ?), was an American woman enslaved sometime in the late 1810s, whose freedom suit in Louisiana was based on her claimed status as a free German immigrant born to non-enslaved parents. The case attracted wide attention and publicity because of the issue of "white" slavery. In Sally Miller v. Louis Belmonti (1845 La), the Louisiana Supreme Court ruled in her favor, and Miller gained freedom.

Despite the doctrine of partus sequitur ventrum incorporated into state law, by which children followed the legal status of their mother at the time of birth, Miller was not successful in her attempt to gain freedom from slavery for her three surviving children. In a case settled in her favor by the judge, she won a case in which her former master John Fitz Miller tried to clear his name by proving that she was part-black and had been born into slavery in Miller v. Miller (1849 La). His appeal to the State Supreme Court was dismissed. Her identity remains controversial.

== Background ==
Beginning in 1816, many impoverished Europeans immigrated to the United States as refugees from the crop failures of the Year Without a Summer, the wars of Napoleon, and other economic and social problems. Among the flood of refugees to Louisiana in 1818 were several families from Langensoultzbach in Alsace, on the lower Rhine, including Daniel Müller, a shoemaker; his wife Dorothea, two sons, and their daughters Dorothea and Salomé. (Although this part of Alsace was then within French territory, and has been again since World War II, it was near the German border and had many ethnic German residents such as the Müllers, who spoke a German dialect.) Their journey was complicated: They paid passage to Philadelphia on the Russian ship Rudolph in August 1817, but the ship's passengers (some 900 people) had been swindled by dishonest brokers who never intended to set sail. The Dutch government chartered three ships to carry the Rudolph's passengers to the U.S.—but to New Orleans, not Philadelphia. Daniel Müller's wife and infant son and around 600 members of the group died on the voyage. The Müllers had traveled on the Juffer Johanna, and the ship's captain refused to let passengers disembark without further payment. Therefore, Müller signed a "redemption" or indenture agreement, bartering the labor of him and his family for several years.

In March 1818, the surviving Müllers arrived in New Orleans. Their indenture contracts were reportedly sold to John Fitz Miller of Attakapas Parish (now St. Martin Parish), who had a sugar cane plantation. A few weeks after the family were taken to the Miller plantation, his friends and relatives in New Orleans learned that Daniel Müller and his older son Jacob, age 10, had died of fever; they were not able to discover what had happened to the two young girls: Dorothea, age 8, and Salomé, age 4, nor were they able to locate them.

In 1843, the Müllers' friend and fellow immigrant Madame Karl Rouff was served by an enslaved woman at a cafe in New Orleans. She came to think that the woman must be Salomé Müller from her home village, grown to adulthood. Held as the legal property of Louis Belmonti (also spelled Belmonte or Belmont in historic accounts), the woman was known as Mary Miller. Mme Karl took Miller to the home of Salomé Müller's cousin and godmother Eva Schuber and her husband Francis, who also identified her as Salomé.

They began an extended legal struggle to have Mary (later called Sally) Miller recognized as a native European and free woman. Miller also tried to free her children. She had four children: Lafayette (who died about 1839), Madison, Charles and Adeline.

== Freedom suit ==
Miller's German supporters hired Harvard-educated Wheelock Samuel Upton as lawyer; he filed the freedom suit as Sally Miller v. Louis Belmonti and John Miller (called in warranty) (1844 La) (later referred to as Miller v. Belmonti (1844)) on July 24, 1844, in the First District Court of Louisiana. He sued not only Belmonti but also John Fitz Miller, the planter who originally held Sally Miller. Belmonti was soon dropped from the case, as he was believed to have purchased the slave woman in 1838 in good faith, according to existing laws.

In the case, Upton charged the planter John F. Miller with having reduced the indentured servant to slavery upon the death of her father and older brother. Fitz Miller resented the accusation and used his considerable power and influence to prevent Sally Miller's gaining freedom. He contended he had purchased her as a slave.

Much conflicting evidence was introduced during the trial. Arguments on both sides during the trial reflected racial mythology of the time. For example, Upton argued that Miller could not be a quartronne (1/16 Negro) because "the Quartronne is idle, reckless and extravagant, this woman is industrious, careful and prudent." The questioning of slavery in the context of denouncing Sally Miller's situation also rested on racist prejudices. According to preconceived notions also widespread among abolitionists, the purity of white women contrasted with the hypersexuality of black men, and the fact that Sally Miller's status as a slave had exposed her to sexual promiscuity with black men, with whom she had children, was particularly shocking for the time.

Miller's obvious European ancestry was no guarantee of her free status. By this time many mixed-race children fathered by European males had been born into generations of slavery, and some were mostly white in ancestry. In Louisiana, for instance, early French colonists had often taken slave women as mistresses or common-law wives. Under the legal doctrine of partus sequitur ventrum (literally "the child follows the womb", also known as partus), the children were held as born into slavery, because their mothers were slaves. This principle had been incorporated into colonial and state laws since the 17th century.

In New Orleans and other French-dominated cities, numerous mixed-race women and their children had achieved freedom or social status through the system of plaçage, which had become institutionalized among the ethnic French and Spanish colonists, in which slave or free women of color were mistresses for a time to French Creoles. They often gained freedom, education or property from the arrangement. New Orleans had a high proportion of free people of color, who intermarried with each other as a class. Their numbers had increased in the early nineteenth century with the arrival of thousands of refugee free people of color fleeing the disruption of the revolution in Haiti. Now known as Louisiana Creoles, the mixed-race residents then constituted a separate class between the European-Americans and the large majority of mostly black African slaves.

The Fifth District Court ruled against Sally Miller, but the following year in 1845, the State Supreme Court ruled in her favor. Its ruling in Miller v. Belmonti (1845) included this statement:

That on the law of slavery in the case of a person visibly appearing to be a white man, or an Indian, the presumption is he is free, and it is necessary for his adversity to show that he is a slave.

== Aftermath ==
The Supreme Court's 1845 decision was unpopular in Louisiana, where there were many slaves of mixed race. The case highlighted the extensive interracial relationships that resulted in "white" slaves. The Court's ruling was also unpopular across the South, where the abolition movement was considered a growing threat to the Southern economy and culture.

In 1846 the Louisiana State Constitutional Convention abolished the Louisiana Supreme Court. Historians believe this was in retaliation for Chief Justice Martin's ruling in the Sally Miller case. When the Commission re-established a state Supreme Court the following day, it did not reappoint Chief Justice Francois Xavier Martin or any of his five colleagues to the bench.

After gaining her freedom, Miller petitioned to have her mixed-race children freed based on their having been born to a woman who was legally free. John F. Miller and his supporters continued to dispute her claim as a native European. At a new trial, known as Miller v. Miller (1849 La), John Miller and his team produced new witness testimony and additional documentation to try to prove that Sally Miller was part-black and legally born into slavery. The planter was trying to salvage his reputation, but he lost by the judge's decision in the Fifth District Court in 1848, who supported the original State Supreme Court ruling. The jury had reported it was unable to reach a decision (11 were in favor of Sally Miller and one was opposed), and the attorneys decided to go to the judge. John Miller's appeal to the State Supreme Court was dismissed in 1849. Sally Miller was unable to gain freedom for her three children, however. She was reported in the 1850s to have gone to California.

The abolitionist Parker Pillsbury wrote in 1853 to his colleague William Lloyd Garrison: "A white skin is no security whatsoever. I should no more dare to send white children out to play alone, especially at night ... than I should dare send them into a forest of tigers and hyenas." (published in The National Anti-Slavery Standard, November 12, 1853)

== In popular culture ==
- William Wells Brown relates the story of Sally Miller in Clotel (1853).
- William and Ellen Craft, slaves who had successfully escaped to the North in 1848 and to England in 1850, included a long quote from the Law Reporter about the Sally Miller case in their 1860 book, Running a Thousand Miles for Freedom: The Escape of William and Ellen Craft from Slavery, published in England and widely distributed in the US as well.
- George Washington Cable first published a version of the Sally Miller story in a magazine in 1889. He included it in his collected Strange True Stories of Louisiana (1890). Critics contend that his account is not reliable as history, as his intent was to entertain, rather than to convey the legal and evidentiary aspects of the case.
- John Bailey recounted Sally Miller's story in his nonfiction book, The Lost German Slave Girl (2003). Bailey concludes that Sally Miller was probably not Salomé Müller, but a clever and heroic slave woman who "... seized the one chance of liberty that was ever likely to come her way, and she hung on to that chance with a tenacity I could only marvel at."

== See also ==
- History of slavery in Louisiana
- List of slaves
