= Louisiana Civil Code =

Core of private law in the U.S. state of Louisiana

The Louisiana Civil Code (LCC) constitutes the core of private law in the State of Louisiana. The Louisiana Civil Code is based on a more diverse set of sources than the laws of the other 49 states of the United States: substantive law between private sector parties has a civil law character, based on the French civil code and Spanish codes and ultimately Roman law, with some common law influences.

First enacted on March 31, 1808, in bilingual version as Louisiana Civil Code Digest (French: Digeste de la loi civile)., it was drafted by the lawyers James Brown, Louis Moreau-Lislet and Edward Livingston. Afterwards it underwent continuous revisions and updates. It is still considered the controlling authority in the state; despite the strong influence of common law tradition, the civil law tradition is still deeply rooted in most aspects of Louisiana private law. Thus property, contractual, business entities structure, much of civil procedure, and family law, as well as some aspects of criminal law, are still based mostly on traditional Roman legal thinking.

== See also ==
- Law of Louisiana
- Edward Livingston
- Civil Law Commentaries
- Athanassios Nicholas Yiannopoulos
- Philip H. Morgan
