= Tulane University School of Law =

Law school in New Orleans, Louisiana, US

Coordinates: 29°56′07″N 90°07′22″W

- Motto: Non Sibi Sed Suis (Latin) "Not for oneself, but for one's own"
- Established: 1847; 179 years ago
- School type: Private law school
- Dean: Marcilynn Burke
- Location: New Orleans, Louisiana, U.S.
- USNWR ranking: 71st (2025)
- Website: law.tulane.edu
- ABA profile: Standard 509 Report

The Tulane University School of Law is the law school of Tulane University. It is located on Tulane's Uptown campus in New Orleans, Louisiana. Established in 1847, it is the 12th oldest law school in the United States.

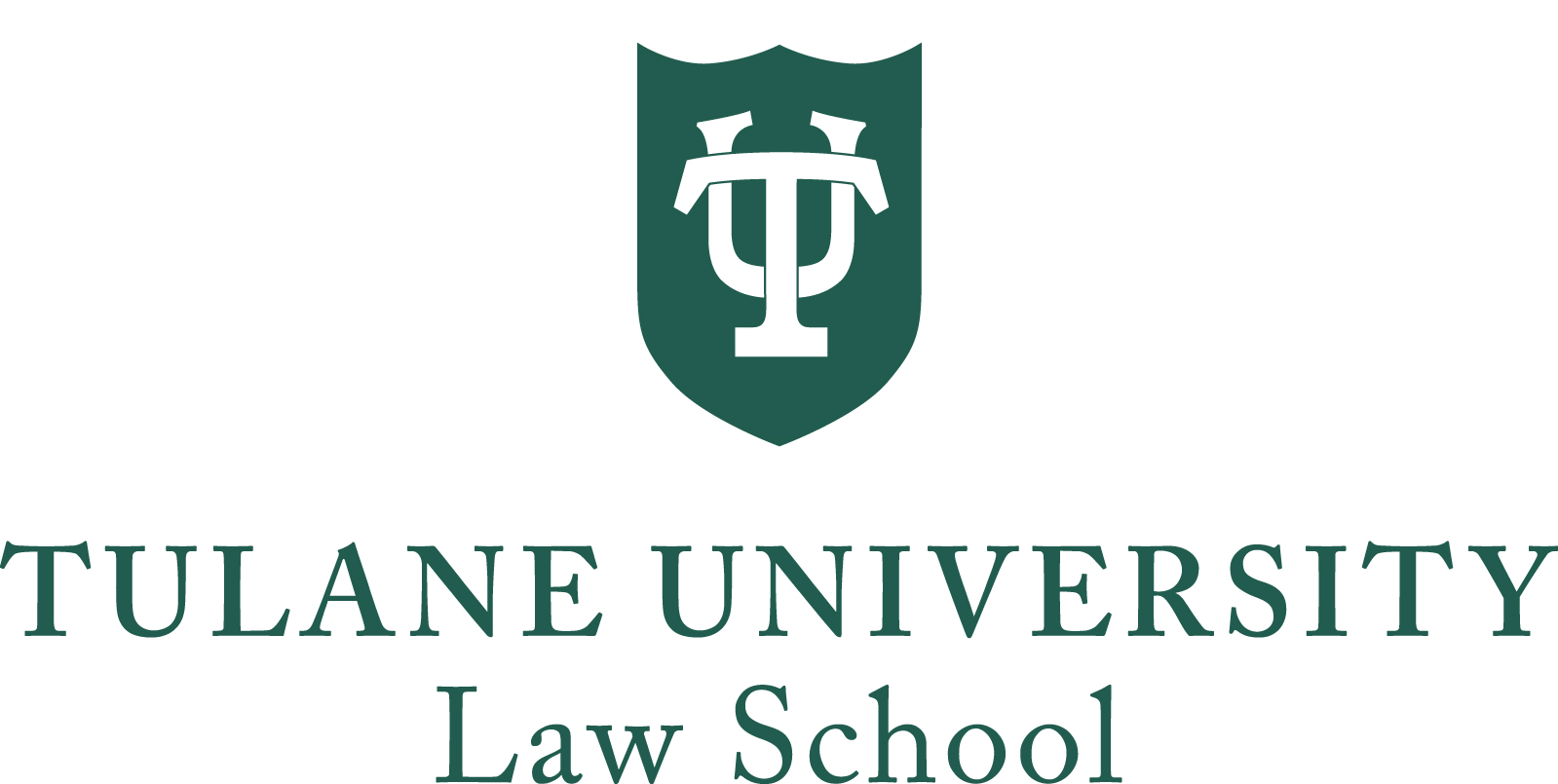
Tulane University Law School logo

== Academics ==
=== Juris Doctor ===
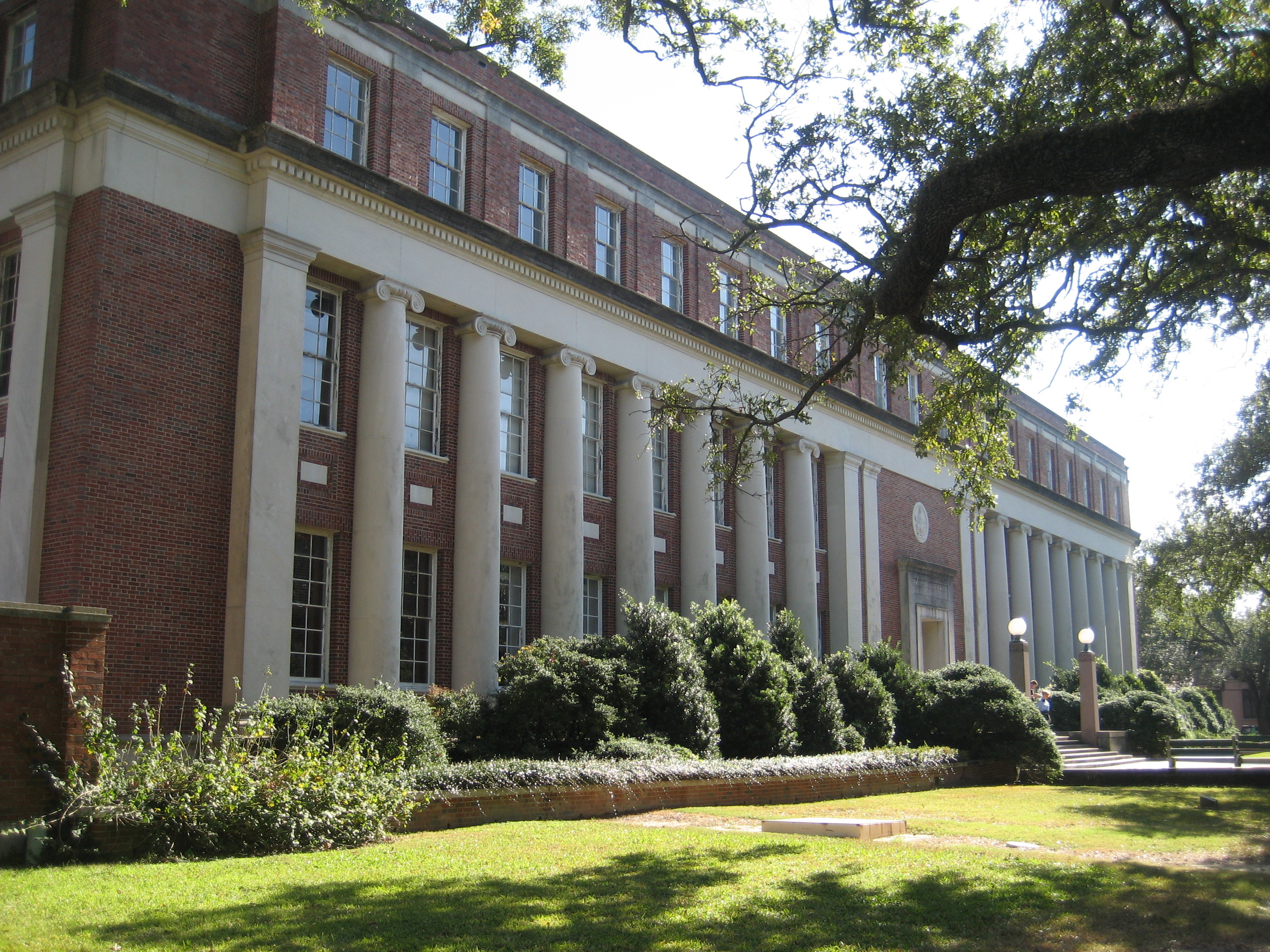
Jones Hall, where the law school was located from 1969 until 1995 and where scenes for The Pelican Brief were filmed.

To complete the Juris Doctor (J.D.) degree program, a student must finish six semesters in residence, 88 credit hours, an upper-level writing requirement, and a 50-hour community-service obligation. The first-year curriculum comprises eight required courses. The first-year legal-research-and-writing program is taught by instructors with significant experience as lawyers and writers, each assisted by senior fellows.

After the first year, all courses are electives, except for a required legal-profession course. All first year and many upper-class courses are taught in multiple sections to allow for smaller classes. The upper-class curriculum includes introductory as well as advanced courses in a broad range of subject areas, including international and comparative law, business law, corporate law, environmental law, maritime law, criminal law, intellectual property, taxation, litigation, and civil procedure, among others.

Tulane Law offers six optional concentration programs for J.D. students who wish to receive one certificate of completion in an area. The six are European legal studies, environmental law, international and comparative law, maritime law, sports law, or civil law.

==== Costs ====
Tuition and fees for a full-time Tulane Law School student for the 2017–2018 academic year are $54,658 ($50,358 tuition and $4,300 in mandatory fees). The total cost of attendance (tuition, fees, books and living expenses) for the 2017–2018 academic year is estimated at $77,334. Law School Transparency estimated total cost of attendance for three years at $284,440 in 2017, noting that for the 2015–16 academic year, 32.3% of students received scholarships of 50% or more of tuition and fees.

=== Clinics ===
The law school offers six live-client clinical programs, in the areas of: civil litigation, criminal defense, juvenile litigation, legislative and administrative advocacy, domestic violence, and environmental law (the Tulane Environmental Law Clinic). In addition, there is a trial-advocacy program, and third-year students may engage in externships with federal and state judges, with a local death-penalty project, or with certain administrative agencies. The judicial externships are possible because of Tulane's close proximity to the U.S. Fifth Circuit Court of Appeals, the U.S. District Court for the Eastern District of Louisiana, and the Louisiana Supreme Court, all of which are in New Orleans. The school was the first in the country to institute a pro bono program requiring that each student complete legally related community service prior to graduation.

Tulane's Eason Weinmann Center for Comparative Law, its Maritime Law Center, and its Institute on Water Policy & Law, promote scholarship in comparative, maritime, and environmental law.

=== Publications ===
Journals published or edited at Tulane Law School include:

- Tulane Law Review
- Tulane Environmental Law Journal
- Tulane Maritime Law Journal
- Tulane Journal of Law and Sexuality, the official law journal for the National LGBT Bar Association
- Tulane European and Civil Law Forum (faculty run)
- Tulane Journal of International and Comparative Law
- Tulane Journal of Technology and Intellectual Property
- Sports Lawyers Journal, edited by Tulane Law students, published and funded by the national Sports Lawyers Association
- Civil Law Commentaries, a publication of the Eason-Weinman Center for Comparative Law

=== Student groups ===
Student organizations sponsor educational programs and social events throughout the academic year. The law school also periodically hosts social events with the Tulane University School of Medicine and the Freeman School of Business. The Entertainment & Sports Law Conference was co-founded by Jeff Frost, Kevin Yorn and Tim Francis, among others, in 2018 as an annual event which brings lawyers, executives and media personalities together to discuss sports and entertainment.

An active moot court program holds trial and appellate competitions within the school and fields teams for a variety of interschool competitions. The Law School has a chapter of the Order of the Coif. The Student Bar Association functions as the student government and recommends students for appointment to faculty committees. Over 40 student organizations are active at Tulane, including Tulane American Constitution Society (ACS), Tulane Criminal Law Society, Federal Bar Association, Maritime Law Society, Sports Law Society, Tulane Women In Law, OUTLaw, Black Law Students Association, Latinx Law Student Association (Formally known as La Alianza), Asian Pacific American Law Students Association, Energy & Environmental Law Society, and several legal fraternities. The Tulane Public Interest Law Foundation raises funds, matched by the Law School, to support as many as 30 students each summer in public interest fellowships with a variety of organizations.

=== Other degree programs ===
==== Graduate programs ====
In addition to the J.D., the school offers two graduate degrees in law: The Master of Laws (LL.M.) the Doctor of Laws (S.J.D.) program. The five specialized LL.M. programs are in: maritime law, energy and environmental law, American business law, American law, and international and comparative law. LL.M. students may also pursue a general LL.M., which does not concentrate in any one area.

==== Study abroad ====
Tulane Law School was one of the first five schools in the United States to offer a foreign summer law program. As of 2008, over 4,000 law students from approximately 140 U.S. law schools attended Tulane Law's summer abroad programs, taught by faculty from Tulane, other U.S. law schools, and universities abroad. Through the years, prominent scholars and federal judges have highlighted Tulane's summer faculty, including Supreme Court justices Harry Blackmun, Stephen Breyer, Ruth Bader Ginsburg, Antonin Scalia, and William Rehnquist. In the past, the law school's summer programs have taken place in Amsterdam in the Netherlands; Berlin in Germany; Cambridge and London in England; Paris and Grenoble in France; Rhodes and Spetses in Greece; and Siena in Italy.

==== JD/MBA ====
Tulane benefits from having a top law school and a top business school located immediately next to one another, both of which consistently rank among the top 50 in the nation, according to the U.S. News & World Report and the Financial Times (the Finance department in particular has been ranked among the top 10 in the world on several occasions). This close proximity has facilitated the growth of Tulane's JD/MBA program. In the '06–'07 school year, Tulane boasted of having 25 joint JD/MBA candidates. In March 2007, Tulane announced that it had hired a new business law professor, whose objectives would include "maximiz[ing]...the growth of the Law School's JD/MBA joint degree," and strengthening ties between the law school and Freeman School of Business. In January 2008, the Tulane JD/MBA Club held a networking event in New York City with the creator of jdmba.com, an interschool JD/MBA networking website.

Recent JD/MBA graduates have gone on to work for law firms, management consulting firms, investment banks, and in-house legal departments in New York, Houston, New Orleans, Los Angeles, and other cities. The program does not require highly qualified applicants to have significant full-time work experience.

In March 2009, the university announced the designation of a $1.5 million donation to support in perpetuity a JD/MBA professor of national stature at Tulane.

==== JD/MHA ====
The joint Juris Doctor/Master of Health Administration program with the Tulane School of Public Health and Tropical Medicine (TUSPH&TM) permits students to earn both degrees in 4 years, whereas normally the JD would take 3 years and the MHA, 2 years. Students take 79 units in the law school (rather than the normally-required 88 units) and 46 units in TUSPH&TM. Students are permitted to skip the course Social and Behavioral Aspects of Global Health which is normally required for the Public Health Core. Students take Health Care Law in the law school instead of the TUSPH&TM version of the course, and the course counts for both JD and MHA.

In recent years, the program has enrolled 0–2 students per year and graduating students have gone into health care law practice and health care management in approximately equal numbers.

==== JD/MA in Latin American Studies ====
Enriched by Tulane's position of hosting one of the top Latin American Studies programs in the United States, the joint degree in law and Latin American Studies meets the need for "lawyer-statesmen" who know the law and who understand the societies of Latin America. The program employs a multi-disciplinary approach intended to enhance appreciation of the economic, social, political, and other forces in Latin America that influence the development of law and legal institutions. In addition to law school requirements, students pursuing the joint JD/MA in Latin American Studies must complete 24 semester hours of coursework in graduate courses approved by the Roger Thayer Stone Center for Latin American Studies. Demonstrated competence in either Spanish or Portuguese is required, and competence in both is encouraged.

==== International development ====
The Payson Center for International Development, which became part of the Law School in 2008, confers Master of Science, Joint Juris Doctor and Master of Science, Master of Laws (LLM) in Development, and Doctoral degrees.

== Campus ==
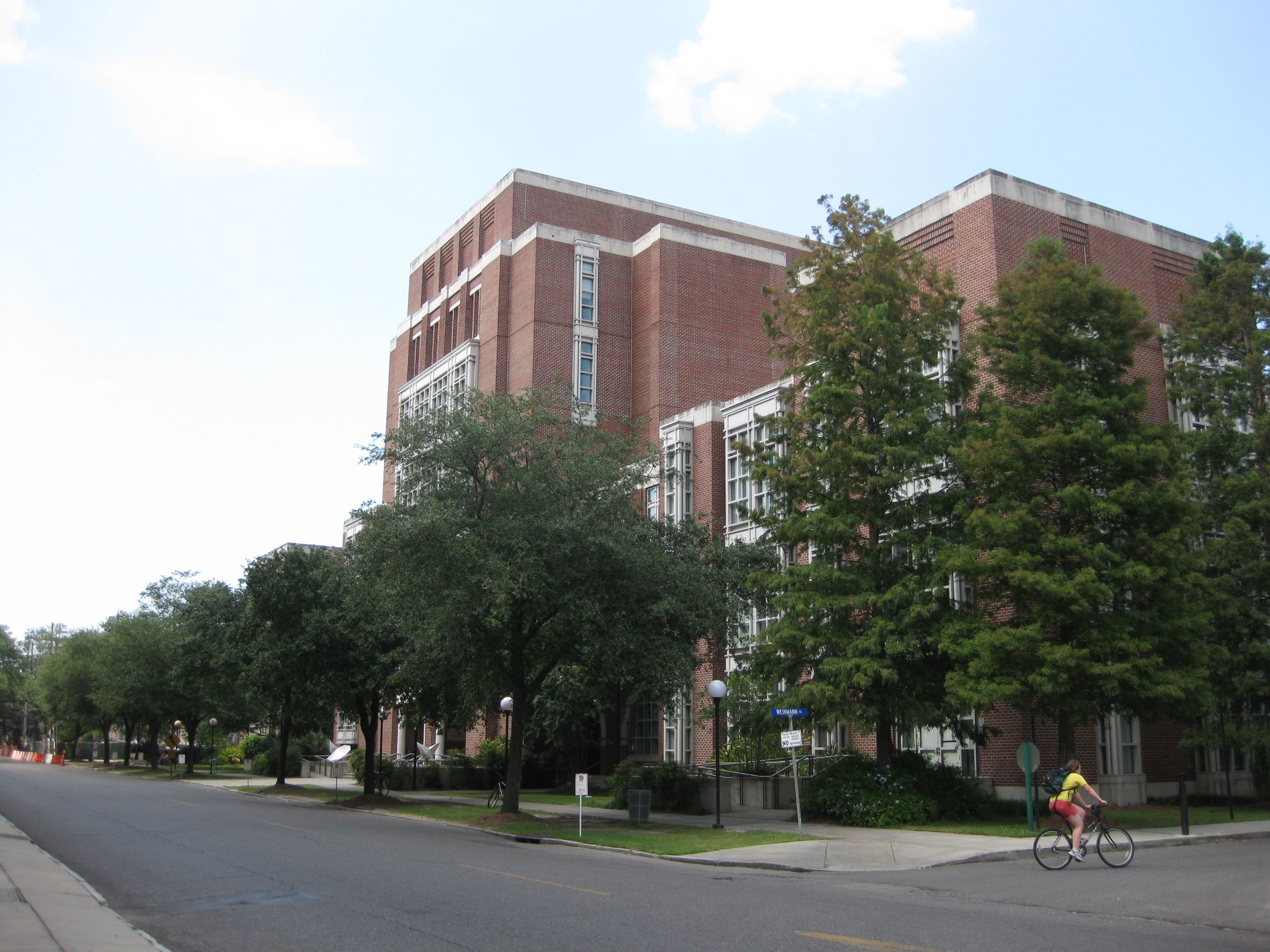
John Giffen Weinmann Hall, Tulane University School of Law's main building.

The law school's 160,000-square-foot (15,000 m^{2}) building, John Giffen Weinmann Hall, was completed in 1995. Designed to integrate classrooms, a student lounge, a computer lab, faculty offices, and a law library that contains both national and international collections, the building is centrally located on Tulane's Uptown campus. The law school has been on the Uptown campus since 1906, and has been housed in several buildings since then, until the completion of Weinmann Hall. The law school was located in Jones Hall from 1969 until 1995, where scenes for The Pelican Brief were filmed.

Next to Weinmann Hall on the 6200 block of Freret Street is the Law Annex, a light gray cobblestone building that houses the Center for Energy Law and the Center for Environmental Law. The Law Annex was a faculty residence before being converted for its current use. Nearby is the Howard-Tilton Memorial Library, Tulane's main library; the Lavin-Bernick Center, which houses university dining facilities and the university bookstore; the Reily Student Recreation Center (a gym with indoor and outdoor swimming pools, and basketball, squash, and tennis courts); the Freeman School of Business; the Newcomb Art Gallery; and various other buildings.

The Uptown campus is marked by many large live oak trees and historically significant buildings. Architectural styles include Richardsonian Romanesque, Elizabethan, Renaissance, Brutalist, and Modern architecture. The front-of-campus buildings use white Indiana Limestone or orange brick for exteriors, while the middle-of-campus buildings are mostly adorned in red St. Joe brick. In all, Tulane's Uptown campus occupies more than 110 acres (0.4 km^{2}), facing St. Charles Avenue directly opposite Audubon Park, which features the Audubon Zoo, and a 1.8-mile (2.9 km) pedestrian trail around a public golf course. The campus is also a short bicycle ride from the Mississippi River and a 25+ mile bicycling/jogging trail that runs along it. The St. Charles Avenue Streetcar Line makes the campus accessible via public transit. Loyola University is directly adjacent to Tulane, on the downriver side.

== Reception ==
=== Employment ===
According to Tulane Law School's 2015 ABA-required disclosures, 60% of the Class of 2015 obtained full-time, long-term, bar passage-required employment nine months after graduation, excluding solo practitioners, and 4.9% of the class was seeking employment but not employed. According to Tulane Law School's official 2017 ABA-required disclosures, 63.3% of the Class of 2016 was employed in non-school-funded, full-time, long-term, bar passage required jobs nine months after graduation, and 6.5% of the class was seeking employment but not employed.

=== Bar passage ===
Tulane University School of Law graduates had the 2nd highest passing rate, after LSU, on the Louisiana State Bar Exam administered in July 2021, according to results released by the Louisiana Supreme Court Committee. In all, 84.3 percent of Tulane students passed the bar on their first attempt, compared to the state average of 78.4 percent.

=== Rankings ===
According to the 2023–2024 rankings published by U.S. News & World Report, Tulane University School of Law is ranked 78th (tied) amongst 196 law schools fully accredited by the American Bar Association. In March 2018, Law.com ranked Tulane Law 36th among its list of The Top 50 Go-To Law Schools. Tulane Law is ranked 37th in Law School 100's 2018 ranking, which relies on a qualitative assessment. The Leiter Law School ranking, conducted in 2010, put Tulane at 38th, based on student quality. The Hylton law school rankings, conducted in 2006, put Tulane at 39th.

In scoring that runs from .14 (least ethnically diverse) to .73 (most diverse), Tulane's diversity index, according to the 2018 U.S. News & World Report Law School Diversity Index, is .33, with Hispanic students the largest minority at 8% of the student body. By way of comparison, among the top ten of U.S. News & World Report's Best Law Schools, those nearest to Tulane in this category are Duke University, with a score of .42, and University of Virginia, at .37.

More recently, Tulane Law's total student population is 76% White, with Students of Color making up 24% of the student body. Tulane Law Faculty's is composed of only 8 Full-Time Faculty members of Color and 9 more Non-full-Time Faculty of color for a total of 17 or 14% of its total faculty.

=== In popular culture ===
- In the sitcom Frank's Place, Bubba Weisberger (played by Robert Harper) is a Tulane Law School graduate.
- CBS 60 Minutes II features TELC's work in the episode "Justice for Sale?" (March 24, 2000)
- PBS Frontline features TELC's work in the episode, "Justice for Sale" (November 23, 1999)
- NOW on PBS features TELC's work in the episode, "Formula for Disaster" (July 15, 2005).

== People ==
=== Current faculty ===
- Lawrence Ponoroff – former professor and dean (was 21st dean from 2001 to 2009); appointed by the Chief Justice to the Advisory Committee on Bankruptcy Rules to the United States

=== Former faculty ===
- Michael R. Fontham – author of Trial Technique and Evidence, an Evidence book used by law students and practicing attorneys
- Loulan Pitre Jr. – New Orleans lawyer with specialty in environmental issues, Harvard Law School graduate; member of the Louisiana House of Representatives for Lafourche Parish, 2000–2008
- Edward F. Sherman – served as the 20th dean, from 1996 to 2001; helped Vietnam write its code of civil procedure
- David Bonderman, a founder of TPG Capital, one of the largest private equity investment firms globally
- James B. Eustis, U.S. Senator from 1876 to 1879
- Hoffman Franklin Fuller, professor-emeritus; authority on tax law
- John R. Kramer, served as the 19th dean, from 1986 to 1996; counsel to U.S. Rep. Adam Clayton Powell Jr. (D- N.Y.)
- Cecil Morgan, New York City executive of Standard Oil; served as dean from 1963 to 1968
- Ferdinand Stone – former professor of civil law
- Jonathan Turley, second most-cited law professor in the United States
- U.S. Supreme Court Justices: Harry Blackmun, Stephen Breyer, Ruth Ginsburg, Antonin Scalia, and Chief Justice William Rehnquist during Tulane Law Summer Study abroad.
- Manuel Rodríguez Ramos, writer, Dean Emeritus of University of Puerto Rico School of Law and Secretary of Justice of Puerto Rico.
- Tania Tetlow – former Felder-Fayard Professor of Law and Vice President of Tulane University, named first female—and first non-Jesuit—President of Loyola University of New Orleans

== See also ==
- H. Sophie Newcomb Memorial College
