= List of law reviews in the United States =

Following is an incomplete list of notable law reviews currently or previously published in the United States. The List of law schools in the United States includes additional schools which may publish a law review or other legal journal.

There are several different ways by which law reviews are ranked against one another, but the most commonly cited ranking is the Washington & Lee Law Journal Ranking.

== By topic ==
=== General ===
- Albany Law Review, successor to the Albany Law School Journal
- Arizona State Law Journal
- British Journal of American Legal Studies
- Buffalo Law Review
- BYU Law Review
- California Law Review
- Catholic University Law Review
- Columbia Law Review, successor to the Columbia Jurist
- Connecticut Law Review
- Dartmouth Law Journal
- Denver Law Review
- Duke Law Journal
- Emory Law Journal
- Florida Law Review
- Fordham Law Review
- George Mason Law Review
- George Washington Law Review
- Georgetown Law Journal
- Georgia Law Review
- Georgia State University Law Review
- Harvard Law Review
- Hastings Law Journal
- Hofstra Law Review
- Houston Law Review
- Indiana Law Journal
- Iowa Law Review
- Marquette Law Review
- Michigan Law Review
- Minnesota Law Review
- Mississippi Law Journal
- Mitchell Hamline Law Review
- New England Law Review
- New York University Law Review
- North Carolina Law Review
- Northwestern University Law Review
- Notre Dame Law Review
- Penn State Law Review
- Pepperdine Law Review
- Rutgers University Law Review
- Saint Louis University Law Journal
- Seton Hall Law Review
- South Carolina Law Review
- Southern California Law Review
- Stanford Law Review
- Syracuse Law Review
- Tennessee Law Review
- Texas Law Review
- Tulane Law Review
- UCLA Law Review
- University of Chicago Law Review
- University of Florida Law Review
- University of Illinois Law Review
- University of Louisville Law Review
- University of Pennsylvania Law Review
- University of Pittsburgh Law Review
- Vanderbilt Law Review
- Virginia Law Review
- Wake Forest Law Review
- Washington University Law Review
- West Virginia Law Review
- Willamette Law Review
- Wisconsin Law Review
- Yale Law Journal

=== Administrative law ===
- Administrative Law Review
- Texas Tech Administrative Law Journal
- Yale Journal on Regulation

=== Business and commercial law ===
- American Bankruptcy Institute Law Review
- Civil Law Commentaries

=== Constitutional law ===
- Duke Journal of Constitutional Law & Public Policy
- First Amendment Law Review
- George Mason University Civil Rights Law Journal
- Harvard Civil Rights-Civil Liberties Law Review
- Harvard Journal on Legislation
- Hastings Constitutional Law Quarterly
- Publius: The Journal of Federalism
- Texas Journal on Civil Liberties & Civil Rights
- University of Pennsylvania Journal of Constitutional Law
- Alabama Civil Rights & Civil Liberties Law Review

=== Criminal law ===
- American Criminal Law Review
- Journal of Criminal Law & Criminology

=== Environmental law ===
- Arizona Journal of Environmental Law and Policy
- Columbia Journal of Environmental Law
- University of Denver Water Law Review
- Ecology Law Quarterly
- Environmental Law
- Environs: Environmental Law and Policy Journal
- Fordham Environmental Law Review
- Georgetown International Environmental Law Review
- Harvard Environmental Law Review
- Hastings West-Northwest Journal of Environmental Law and Policy
- Journal of Environmental Law and Litigation
- Journal of Land Use and Environmental Law
- Michigan Journal of Environmental and Administrative Law
- Michigan Journal of Environmental and Administrative Law
- San Diego Journal of Climate and Energy Law
- Stanford Environmental Law Journal
- Tulane Environmental Law Journal
- UCLA Journal of Environmental Law and Policy
- Virginia Environmental Law Journal

=== International law ===
- Emory International Law Review
- Houston Journal of International Law
- San Diego International Law Journal
- Texas International Law Journal

=== Labor law ===
- Berkeley Journal of Employment & Labor Law
- Comparative Labor Law and Policy Journal
- Employee Relations Law Journal
- Hofstra Labor and Employment Law Journal
- Labor Law Journal
- University of Pennsylvania Journal of Business Law

=== Public law ===
- Albany Government Law Review
- Connecticut Public Interest Law Journal
- Cornell Journal of Law and Public Policy
- Harvard Journal of Law and Public Policy
- Harvard Law and Policy Review
- Journal of Legislation
- Psychology, Public Policy and Law
- Rutgers Journal of Law & Public Policy
- Texas Review of Law and Politics
- The Urban Lawyer

=== Science and technology ===
- Albany Law Journal of Science and Technology
- Harvard Journal of Law & Technology
- Jurimetrics
- Journal of Intellectual Property and Entertainment Law
- Northwestern Journal of Technology and Intellectual Property
- Pittsburgh Journal of Technology Law & Policy
- University of Florida Journal of Technology Law and Policy

=== Sports ===
- Texas Review of Entertainment & Sports Law

=== Other ===
- American Journal of Comparative Law
- American Journal of Legal History
- Animal Law Review
- Chicago-Kent Journal of Intellectual Property
- Columbia Business Law Review
- Columbia Human Rights Law Review
- Columbia Journal of Law & the Arts
- Columbia Journal of Tax Law
- Construction Law Journal
- Fordham Intellectual Property, Media & Entertainment Law Journal
- Florida State University Business Review
- Houston Journal of Health Law & Policy
- Immigration and Nationality Law Review
- Indiana Health Law Review
- Juvenile and Family Court Journal
- Journal of Business, Entrepreneurship and the Law
- Journal of Competition Law & Economics
- Journal of Intellectual Property Law & Practice
- Journal of Law and Commerce
- The Journal of Law and Economics
- Journal of Law & Politics
- Journal of Law and Religion
- The Journal of Legal Studies
- Journal of Technology Law & Policy
- Law & Critique
- Law and Inequality
- Law and Human Behavior
- Law & Society Review
- Loyola Consumer Law Review
- Medical Law International
- Nanotechnology Law & Business
- New York University Journal of Law & Liberty
- NYU Annual Survey of American Law
- NYU Journal of Law & Business
- Pittsburgh Tax Review
- The Review of Litigation
- Supreme Court Economic Review
- Supreme Court Review
- The Jurist
- Tulane European and Civil Law Forum
- Tulane Journal of Law & Sexuality
- Tulane Journal of Technology and Intellectual Property
- Tulane Maritime Law Journal
- University of Michigan Journal of Law Reform
- University of San Francisco Maritime Law Journal
- Virginia Tax Review
- Wake Forest Intellectual Property Law Journal
- Women's Rights Law Reporter

== See also ==
- Law review
