= List of environmental journals =

This is a list of scholarly, peer-reviewed academic journals focused on the biophysical environment and/or humans' relations with it. Inclusion of journals focused on the built environment is appropriate. Included in this list are journals from a wide variety of interdisciplinary fields including from the environmental sciences, environmental social sciences, environmental humanities, etc.

== General ==
- A\J: Alternatives Journal—published by the Environmental Studies Association of Canada
- Annual Review of Environment and Resources—published by Annual Reviews
- eco.mont (Journal on Protected Mountain Areas Research and Management)—established by the Austrian Academy of Sciences, the University of Innsbruck, and other organizations—covering mountain research in protected area
- Environmental Sciences Europe—published by Springer Science+Business Media
- International Journal of Environmental Research—published by University of Tehran
- Journal of Environmental Engineering—published by the American Society of Civil Engineers

== Climate change ==
- Bulletin of the American Meteorological Society—published by the American Meteorological Society
- Climatic Change—published by Springer Science+Business Media
- Global Change Biology—published by Wiley
- Journal of Climate—published by the American Meteorological Society
- Nature Climate Change—published by Nature Portfolio

== Energy and renewable energy ==
- Advanced Energy Materials—published by Wiley-VCH
- Energies—published by MDPI
- Energy & Environment – edited by Sonja Boehmer-Christiansen; published by Multi-Science Publishing, Brentwood, Essex
- Energy and Environmental Science—published by the Royal Society of Chemistry
- Energy Economics—published by Elsevier
- Energy Policy—published by Elsevier
- Energy Procedia—published by Elsevier
- Energy Research & Social Science—published by Elsevier
- GCB Bioenergy—published by Wiley
- Joule—published by Cell Press
- Journal of Cleaner Production—published by Elsevier
- Journal of Renewable and Sustainable Energy—published by the American Institute of Physics
- Nature Energy—published by Nature Portfolio
- Renewable Energy—published by Elsevier
- Renewable and Sustainable Energy Reviews—published by Elsevier
- Smart Energy—published by Elsevier
- Solar Energy—published by Elsevier
- Solar Energy Materials and Solar Cells—published by Elsevier
- Wind Energy—published by Wiley

== Environmental and energy law ==
- Appalachian Natural Resources Law Journal—published at the Appalachian School of Law
- Columbia Journal of Environmental Law—published at Columbia University's School of Law
- University of Denver Water Law Review—published at University of Denver's Sturm College of Law
- Ecology Law Quarterly—published at the UC Berkeley School of Law
- Environmental Law—published at Lewis & Clark Law School
- Environs: Environmental Law and Policy Journal—published at the University of California, Davis School of Law
- Fordham Environmental Law Review (ELR)—published by Fordham University in the United States
- Georgetown International Environmental Law Review—published at Georgetown University Law Center
- Harvard Environmental Law Review—published at Harvard Law School
- Hastings Environmental Law Journal—published at Hastings College of Law
- Journal of Environmental and Sustainability Law—published at the University of Missouri School of Law
- Journal of Environmental Law and Litigation—published at the University of Oregon School of Law
- Journal of Land Use and Environmental Law—published at the Florida State University College of Law
- LSU Journal of Energy Law and Resources—published at the Louisiana State University Paul M. Hebert Law Center
- McGill International Journal of Sustainable Development Law and Policy—published at McGill University
- Michigan Journal of Environmental and Administrative Law—published at the University of Michigan Law School
- Natural Resources Journal—published by the University of New Mexico School of Law
- Oil, Gas and Energy Law—published by Maris B.V., the Netherlands
- Pittsburgh Journal of Environmental and Public Health Law—published at the University of Pittsburgh School of Law
- San Diego Journal of Climate and Energy Law—published at University of San Diego School of Law
- Stanford Environmental Law Journal—published at Stanford Law School
- Tulane Environmental Law Journal—published at Tulane University Law School
- UCLA Journal of Environmental Law and Policy—published at the University of California, Los Angeles School of Law
- Virginia Environmental Law Journal—published at the University of Virginia School of Law

== Environmental economics ==
- American Journal of Agricultural Economics—the official journal of the Agricultural & Applied Economics Association
- Annual Review of Resource Economics—published by Annual Reviews
- Ecological Economics—published by the International Society for Ecological Economics since 1989
- Environmental and Resource Economics—the official journal of the European Association of Environmental and Resource Economists
- Journal of Environmental Economics and Management (JEEM) — published by Elsevier
- Land Economics—published by the University of Wisconsin Press
- Marine Resource Economics—published by the MRE Foundation in affiliation with the North American Association of Fisheries & the International Institute of Fisheries Economics and Trade
- Review of Environmental Economics and Policy—the official "accessible" (meaning more approachable) journal of the Association of Environmental and Resource Economists, published by the University of Chicago Press

== Environmental health ==
- Environmental Health—published by BioMed Central from 2002; open access
- Environmental Health Perspectives—published by US National Institute of Environmental Health Sciences from 1972; open-access
- International Journal of Environmental Research and Public Health—published by MDPI in Switzerland
- Journal of Environmental Science and Health, Part C—published by Taylor & Francis
- Journal of Occupational and Environmental Medicine
- Journal of Toxicology and Environmental Health—published by Taylor & Francis
- Toxicology–published by Elsevier since 1973
- Toxicology and Industrial Health—published by SAGE Publications
- Toxicology Mechanisms and Methods—published by Informa Pharmaceutical Science
- Toxicon—published by Elsevier

== Environmental humanities ==
- Cultural Geographies—published by SAGE Publications
- Environmental Ethics—produced at the Center for Environmental Philosophy at the University of North Texas
- Environmental History—published quarterly for the American Society for Environmental History and the Forest History Society by the University of Chicago Press
- Environmental Philosophy—the journal of the International Association for Environmental Philosophy
- Environmental Values—published by White Horse Press, Lancashire, England
- Journal of Interpretation Research—published by the National Association for Interpretation
- Journal for the Study of Religion, Nature and Culture—the journal of the International Society for the Study of Religion, Nature and Culture
- Nature+Culture—published by Berghahn Books

== Environmental sciences ==
- Agriculture, Ecosystems & Environment—published by Elsevier
- Applied and Environmental Microbiology—published by the American Society for Microbiology
- Aquatic Toxicology—published by Elsevier
- Arctic—published by the Arctic Institute of North America
- Carbon Balance and Management—published by BioMed Central
- Chemosphere—published by Elsevier
- Communications Earth & Environment—published by Nature Portfolio
- Current Opinion in Environmental Science & Health—published by Elsevier
- Current Opinion in Environmental Sustainability—published by Elsevier
- Ecological Complexity—published by Elsevier
- Ecology—published by the Ecological Society of America
- Ecosphere—published by the Ecological Society of America
- Environmental Biology of Fishes—published by Springer Science+Business Media
- Environmental Chemistry—published monthly by CSIRO Publishing
- Environmental Earth Sciences—published by Springer Science+Business Media
- Environmental Research—published by Elsevier
- Environmental Research Letters—published by the Institute of Physics (IOP)
- Environmental Science & Technology—published by the American Chemical Society
- Environmental Science: Processes & Impacts—published monthly by the Royal Society of Chemistry
- Environment International—published by Elsevier
- Frontiers in Ecology and the Environment—published ten times per year on behalf of the Ecological Society of America
- Functional Ecology—published by Wiley
- Global Change Biology—published by Wiley
- Green Chemistry—published by the Royal Society of Chemistry
- Green Chemistry Letters and Reviews—published by Taylor & Francis
- International Journal of Environmental Research and Public Health—published by MDPI
- Journal of Cleaner Production—published by Elsevier
- Journal of Ecology—published bi-monthly on behalf of the British Ecological Society and focused on plant ecology
- Journal of Environmental Management—published by Elsevier
- Journal of the IEST—the official publication of the Institute of Environmental Sciences and Technology
- Science of the Total Environment—published by Elsevier
- Sustainability—published by MDPI (open access)
- Trends in Ecology and Evolution—published by Cell Press
- Nature Geoscience—published by Nature Portfolio
- Nature Reviews Earth & Environment—published by Nature Portfolio
- Nature Sustainability—published by Nature Portfolio

== Environmental social sciences ==
- Children Youth and Environments Journal—published online by the Children Youth and Environments Center at the University of Colorado
- Ecological Economics
- Energy Research & Social Science—published by Elsevier
- Environment and Behavior—published by SAGE
- Environmental Communication—published by Routledge
- Environmental Politics—published by Taylor and Francis
- Global Environmental Change—published by Elsevier
- Global Environmental Politics—published by the MIT Press
- Journal of Environmental Economics and Management
- Journal of Environmental Psychology—published by Elsevier
- Journal of Political Ecology— published by University of Arizona
- Organization & Environment—edited by J. Alberto Aragon-Correa (University of Granada) and Mark Starik (San Francisco State University), published by SAGE Publications
- Population and Environment — published by Springer Science+Business Media
- Review of Environmental Economics and Policy—published by the University of Chicago Press

== See also ==
- List of environmental periodicals—includes literary journals, newsletters, popular magazines and more
- List of forestry journals
- List of planning journals
- Lists of environmental publications
