= Texas Review of Law and Politics =

Texas Review of Law & Politics
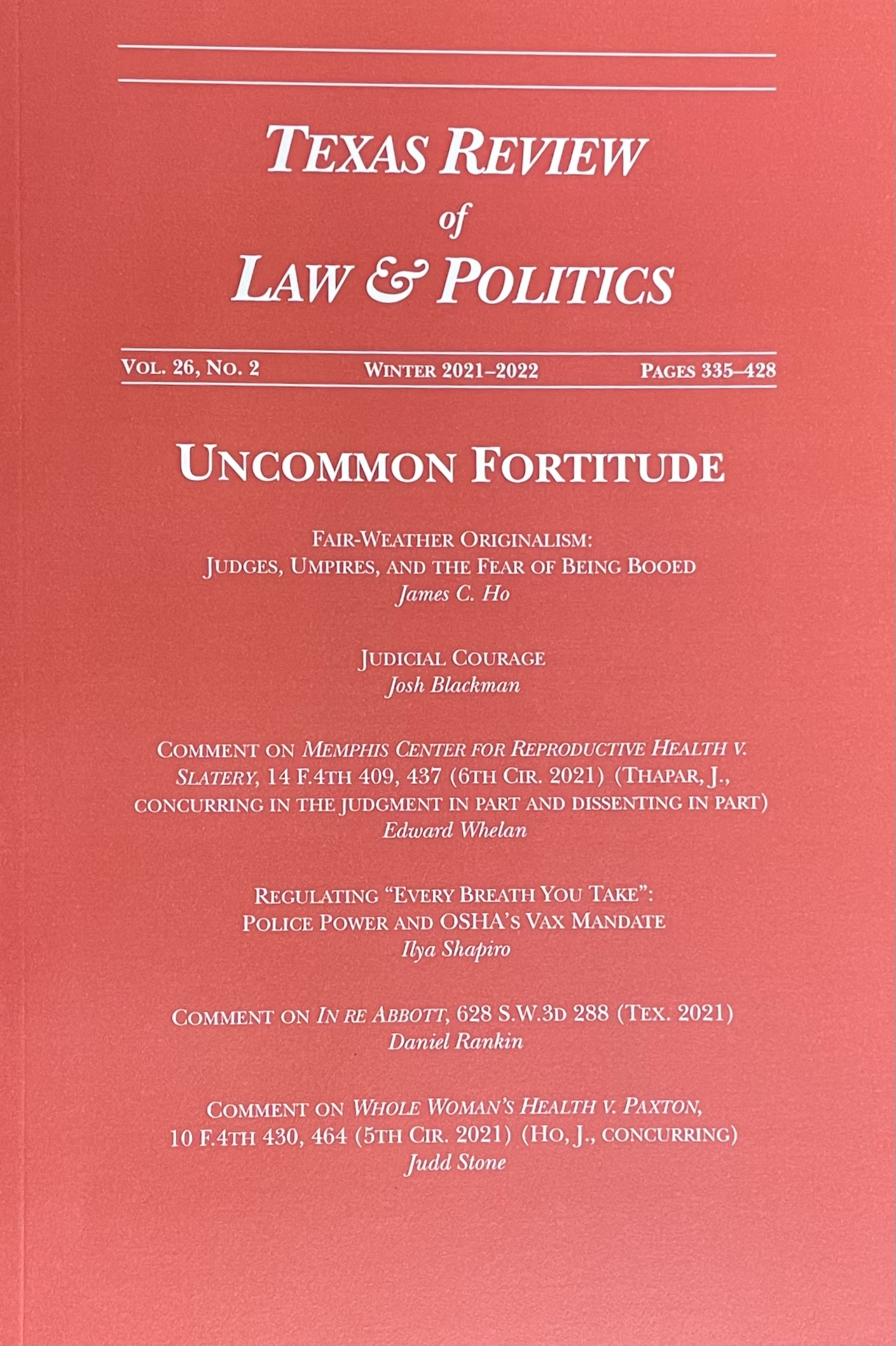
- Discipline: Law
- Language: English

Publication details
- History: 1997 to present
- Publisher: University of Texas School of Law (United States)
- Frequency: Semiannual

Standard abbreviations
- Bluebook: Tex. Rev. L. & Pol.
- ISO 4: Tex. Rev. Law Politics

Indexing
- ISSN: 1098-4577

Links
- Journal homepage

The Texas Review of Law & Politics is a legal publication whose mission is to publish "thoughtful and intellectually rigorous conservative articles—articles that traditional law reviews often fail to publish—that can serve as blueprints for constructive legal reform." Its primary focus is on contemporary social issues such as abortion, affirmative action, crime, gun rights, and free exercise of religion.

The journal, often referred to as "TROLP," publishes work written by scholars, sitting judges, practicing attorneys, and law students. It is published at least twice annually and is managed and operated by students at the University of Texas School of Law.

Past authors include Greg Abbott, Ryan Anderson, Gerard Bradley, Paul Clement, John Cornyn, Ted Cruz, Richard Epstein, Lino Graglia, C. Boyden Gray, Orrin Hatch, Nathan Hecht, James Ho, Edith Jones, Gary Lawson, Ed Meese, William Pryor, Phyllis Schlafly, Eugene Volokh, Ed Whelan, Don Willett, and John Yoo.

== See also ==
- List of law reviews in the United States
- Harvard Journal of Law and Public Policy
- New York University Journal of Law & Liberty
- Georgetown Journal of Law and Public Policy
- Collegiate Network
