= Norman Spaulding =

Norman W. Spaulding III (born 1971) is a professor of federal civil procedure and professional ethics at Stanford Law School.

== Education ==
Spaulding graduated from Williams College in 1993, where he majored in political science. A year later, Spaulding matriculated at Stanford Law, where he was active as a member of the Stanford Law Review and Stanford Environmental Law Journal, as well as the Black Law Students Association. After law school, Spaulding clerked for Northern District of California Judge Thelton Henderson and Ninth Circuit Court of Appeals Judge Betty Fletcher.

== Career ==
After a sojourn into the private sector, Spaulding moved permanently into legal academia in 2000, when he became Acting Professor of Law at Boalt Hall. In 2004, he moved to Stanford. In 2010, he was a visiting professor at Harvard Law School, where he is being considered for a permanent faculty appointment.

== Publications ==
Spaulding has collaborated on a civil procedure casebook, co-authored with Barbara Allen Babcock and Toni Massaro:

- Civil Procedure: Cases and Problems (Aspen Publishers, 2006)

In addition, Spaulding has published in several American law journals, including the University of Colorado Law Review, the Stanford Law Review, the Stanford Environmental Law Journal, and the William and Mary Law Review.
