= Abre' Conner =

American lawyer

- Born: 1987 (age 38–39); Lakeland, Florida, United States
- Education: University of Florida (BA/BS); American University (JD)
- Occupations: Lawyer; environmental activist
- Organization(s): Director of Environmental and Climate Justice, NAACP

Abre' Leann Conner is an American attorney who currently works as the Director of the Center for Environmental and Climate Justice at the National Association for the Advancement of Colored People. Prior to this role she served as Directing Attorney for Health at the Law Foundation of Silicon Valley. She was named one of the Time Closers of 2026.

== Biography ==
She was born and raised in Lakeland and suffered from debilitating asthma in her youth. She later discovered that a cluster of smokestacks she frequently passed by were phosphate plants, and her belief that those contributed to her asthma drove her to focus on civil rights during her university studies at the University of Florida and then on environmental law during her law school at American University. She also served as policy head of the National Black Law Students Association during her time in law school.

She worked at the White House Office of Presidential Personnel as an associate and also worked at the United States Department of Education Office of Civil Rights, the NAACP Legal Defense and Educational Fund, and the Center on Race, Poverty and the Environment, before serving as a staff attorney for the American Civil Liberties Union of Northern California. She went on to take a role as Directing Attorney for Health at the Law Foundation of Silicon Valley in 2021, where she oversaw a team of 20 staffers.

She has become most notable in her current role as the Director of the NAACP's Center for Environmental and Climate Justice, where she focuses on stopping the environmental impact of AI data centers, as well as leading broader environmental justice initiatives of the NAACP such as the Jackson, Mississippi, water crisis.

She also worked as a professor in the Environmental Policy and Management Program at the University of California, Davis, and has testified in front of the House Homeland Security Committee.

Outside of her work, she sits on the American Bar Association Board of Governors and the Earthjustice Board of Trustees, and formerly sat on the Environmental Protection Agency Historically Black Colleges and Universities and Minority Serving Institutions Federal Advisory Council (HBCU-MSI) and as Assembly Speaker of the American Bar Association Young Lawyers Division.

She was named as one of the Time Closers, a list of 18 Black leaders, in 2026. She was also named as one of the 40 under 40 by the National Bar Association and the University of Florida Alumni Association.
