= Indigenous peoples and the environment =

Indigenous peoples have interacted with their environments throughout history.

== Stewardship ==
In the modern era, some of the most biodiverse regions in the world are those managed by Indigenous peoples. Lands that apply traditional low-intensity agricultural practices tend to be more biodiverse than lands that use high-intensity methods. Land use practices in the modern era can be shaped in a way that enhances the fertility of soil, enhances biodiversity, and improves hunting sustainability.

In the modern era, Indigenous cultures often play an important role in environmental conservation, providing stewardship of habitats, plants, and animals. Indigenous communities offer unique values, insights, and practices that can help the broader society address environmental issues.

The fields of ethnoecology and ethnobiology study Indigenous traditions and practices to determine if they may benefit society in the fields of environment, medicine, and other disciplines. Indigenous peoples have frequently campaigned against pollution and environmental racism. Some environmental campaigns by Indigenous peoples are integrated with efforts to promote environmental justice and Indigenous land rights. An analysis of Indigenous cultures in South America in the 21st century found that the cultural diversity they provided correlated strongly with biodiversity in the surrounding environment, suggesting that the existence of culturally unique Indigenous communities contributes to conservation efforts.

== Environmental impacts of ancestral and traditional cultures ==
Misconceptions about the historical relationship between Indigenous populations and their landbase has informed some Westerners view of California's "wild Eden", which may influence policy decisions about the "wilderness". Some academics assumed that the only pre-Colonial human interactions with nature were as "hunter-gatherers". Others say that the relationship was one of "calculated tempered use of nature as active agents of environmental change and stewardship". They argue that a view of "wilderness" as uninhabited nature has resulted in removal of Indigenous inhabitants to preserve "the wild", and that depriving the land of traditional Indigenous practices such as controlled burns, harvesting, and seed scattering has yielded dense understory shrubbery or tickets of young trees which are inhospitable to life. Recent studies indicate that Indigenous peoples used land sustainably, without causing substantial losses of biodiversity, for thousands of years.

A goal is to ascertain an unbiased view of Indigenous practices of resource management. Historical literature, archaeological findings, ecological field studies, and Native Peoples' cultures show indications that Indigenous land management practices were largely successful in promoting habitat heterogeneity, increasing biodiversity, and maintaining certain vegetation types, sustaining human lives while conserving natural resources.

Recently, it has come to light that the deforestation rate of Indonesian rainforests has been far greater than estimated. Such a rate could not have been the product of globalization as understood before; rather, it seemed that ordinary local people dependent on these forests for their livelihoods are in fact "joining distant corporations in creating uninhabitable landscapes."

In eastern Penan, three categories of misrepresentation are noticeable: The practice of 'molong', which means never taking more than necessary, is a concept of resource management based purely on stewardship. Communities or individuals take ownership of specific trees, maintaining and harvesting from them sustainably over a long period of time. Some feel this practice has been romanticized in environmentalist writings. Landscape features and particularly their names in local languages provided geographical and historical information for Penan people; whereas in environmentalist accounts, it has turned into a spiritual practice where trees and rivers represent forest spirits that are sacred to the Penan people. A typical stereotype of some environmentalists' approach to ecological ethnography is to present Indigenous "knowledge" of nature as "valuable" to the outside world because of its hidden medicinal benefits. In reality, eastern Penan populations do not identify a medicinal stream of "knowledge". These misrepresentations in the "narrative" of Indigeneity and "value" of Indigenous knowledge might have been helpful for Penan's people in their struggle to protect their environment, but it might also have disastrous consequences. What happens if another case did not fit in this romantic narrative, or another Indigenous knowledge did not seem beneficial to the outside world. These people were being uprooted in the first place because their communities did not fit well with the state's system of values.

At the 2024 United Nations Biodiversity Conference (COP16), Nations agreed to a new permanent body for Indigenous peoples, which will allow them to advise and offer their view at biodiversity COPs directly.

== Clashes between conservationists and Indigenous peoples ==
In the modern era, some Indigenous communities have been criticized by conservationists for taking actions that are contrary to conservation principles. In these conflicts, conservationists typically claim that the Indigenous peoples are damaging the environment, and Indigenous peoples sometimes claim that the conservationists do not comprehend their traditional values. Accusations of racism sometimes emerge in these conflicts. (Note: Some non-Indigenous people protested when Chippewa Native Americans used modern technologies to exercise their fishing rights.)

Examples where environmentalists opposed the actions of Indigenous peoples include the Miccosukee building modern houses within Everglades National Park, and Navajo people's support for mining of uranium on their lands. In water environments, Inuit hunted harp seals in Canada's Arctic, the Makah tribe hunted grey whales, (Note: The 1999 whale hunt was authorized; the 2007 hunt was unauthorized and the whale sank after being shot.) and the Alaskan Athabaskans hunted beluga whales in Cook Inlet to consume and sell muktuk. Inupiat hunted whales wastefully in the 1970s, fought against a global ban on whaling, and attempted to kill grey whales that were trapped in the ice while environmental groups wanted to free them.

== Attitude towards conservation ==
A common view among Westerners was that prehistoric Indigenous cultures universally lived in harmony with nature and endeavored to conserve and protect the environment. (Note: As early as the 1700s, Europeans were under the mistaken belief that Indigenous peoples (particularly in the New World) had not significantly altered their environment.) This notion is referred to as the myth of the "ecological noble savage". (Note: The term "ecological Indian" is also used, in a North American context, for the notion of ecological noble savage.) This myth is a recent variant of the noble savage cultural stereotype, which originated several hundred years ago in the Western imagination. (Note: The phrase "ecologically noble savage" was first used to describe the myth in 1990.) During the environmental movement of the 1970s, the myth of the ecological noble savage became widespread. The consensus of academics is that the concept of the ecological noble savage was essentially false, and that prehistoric peoples impacted their habitat in virtually all places they inhabited, resulting in significant, permanent changes to the ecosystem, including – in some cases – extinction of species and deforestation. (Note: According to the archaeologist Patrick Vinton Kirch: "The study of human ecodynamics also needs to confront head-on the issue of how past human societies perceived (or failed to perceive) environmental impacts, how social systems themselves adapted or responded to change, and the degree to which such systems could be resilient over long time cycles.")

When considering the impacts of Indigenous cultures on the environment, some scholars distinguish cultures that are ecologists from cultures that are conservationists. The anthropologist Shepard Krech, in his work The Ecological Indian, analyzed the Indigenous peoples of North America and concluded that they (prior to the 20th century) were ecologists because they were deeply aware of the interrelationships between humans, animals, and nature, but they were not conservationists because they did not avoid waste or preserve resources for future availability.

== Applicability of conservation ethics to historical activities ==
Research into the myth of the ecological noble savage led academics to ask if modern values of conservation and sustainability are applicable to prehistoric or Indigenous cultures. Analysis was sometimes dependent on the scientific discipline: conservation scientists and ecologists tended to treat major habitat modifications as disturbances or disruptions, whereas archaeologists and anthropologists tended to view the changes as the natural evolutionary process of niche construction.

Some scholars contend that it is inappropriate to apply Western concepts of ecology or conservation to Indigenous peoples or subsistence cultures. The suggestion that a pristine wilderness, untouched by humans, is an ideal or desirable condition has been criticized as a racist or ethnocentric social construct. In many parts of the world, prehistoric cultures did not (at the time Westerners arrived) place value on (or, in some cases, even have a word for) the idea of wilderness or "nature untouched by humans". The philosopher J. Baird Callicott wrote that the idea of wilderness is "alleged [by various authors] to be ethnocentric, androcentric, phallogocentric, unscientific, unphilosophic, impolitic, outmoded, even genocidal". An alternative to the notion of pristine wilderness is a "humanized landscape" or "humanized nature", defined as habitat that has been modified by humans to suit their needs and enable them to survive. The historian William Cronon argues that humans can only solve environmental problems by applying their culture and civilization to the issues, and that the ideal state of a landscape incorporates those modifications by humans required for their society to grow and thrive.

== Sources ==
- Sharifian, Abolfazl; et al. (2022). "Dynamics of Pastoral Traditional Ecological Knowledge: A Global State-Of-The-Art Review". Ecology and Society. 27 (1) 14. The Resilience Alliance. doi:10.5751/ES-12918-270114. hdl:10138/343991. ISSN 1708-3087.
- Brondízio, Eduardo S. (2021). "Locally Based, Regionally Manifested, And Globally Relevant: Indigenous and Local Knowledge, Values, And Practices for Nature". Annual Review of Environment and Resources. 46. Annual Reviews : 481–509. doi:10.1146/annurev-environ-012220-012127. hdl:10138/337263.
- Berkes, Fikret (2012). Sacred Ecology (Third ed.). Taylor & Francis. ISBN 9781136341731.
- Levis, Carolina; et al. (2024). "Contributions of Human Cultures to Biodiversity and Ecosystem Conservation". Nature Ecology & Evolution. 8 (5). Springer Nature: 866–879. doi:10.1038/s41559-024-02356-1. ISSN 2397-334X.
- Fernández-Llamazares, Álvaro; et al. (2020). "A State-Of-The-Art Review of Indigenous Peoples and Environmental Pollution". Integrated Environmental Assessment and Management. 16 (3): 324–341. doi:10.1002/ieam.4239. ISSN 1551-3793.
- Stewart, Mathew; et al. (2025). "The State of the Late Quaternary Megafauna Extinction Debate: A Systematic Review and Analysis". Frontiers in Mammal Science. 4 1678231. Frontiers Media. doi:10.3389/fmamm.2025.1678231. ISSN 2813-4699.
- Prates, Luciano; et al. (2021). "Late Pleistocene South American Megafaunal Extinctions Associated with Rise of Fishtail Points". Nature Communications. 12 (1) 2175. Springer Nature. doi:10.1038/s41467-021-22506-4. ISSN 2041-1723. PMC 8041891. PMID 33846353.
- Clement, Charles R.; et al. (2010). "Between a Pristine Myth and an Impoverished Future". Biotropica. 42 (5). Association for Tropical Biology & Conservation: 534–536. doi:10.1111/j.1744-7429.2010.00674.x. ISSN 0006-3606.
- Ellis, Erle C. (2021a). "Land Use and Ecological Change: A 12,000-Year History". Annual Review of Environment and Resources. 46: 1–33. doi:10.1146/annurev-environ-012220-010822. ISSN 1543-5938.
- Ellis, Erle C. (2021b). "People Have Shaped Most of Terrestrial Nature for at Least 12,000 Years". PNAS. 118 (17) e2023483118. National Academy of Sciences. doi:10.1073/pnas.2023483118. ISSN 0027-8424.
- Stahl, Peter (1996). "Holocene Biodiversity: An Archaeological Perspective from the Americas". Annual Review of Anthropology. 25 (1). Annual Reviews: 105–126. doi:10.1146/annurev.anthro.25.1.105. ISSN 1545-4290.
- Smith, Eric Alden; et al. (2000). "Conservation and Subsistence in Small-Scale Societies" (PDF). Annual Review of Anthropology. 29. Annual Reviews: 493–524. doi:10.1146/annurev.anthro.29.1.493. ISSN 1545-4290.
- "Makah Tribal Whale Hunt Chronology". NOAA. 2026.
- Harkin, Michael Eugene; Lewis, David Rich, eds. (2007). Native Americans and the Environment: Perspectives on the Ecological Indian. University of Nebraska Press. ISBN 9780803205666.
- Krech, Shepard (1999). The Ecological Indian: Myth and History. WW Norton. ISBN 9780393321005.
- Krech, Shepard; et al. (2005). "Reflections on Conservation, Sustainability, And Environmentalism in Indigenous North America". American Anthropologist. 107 (1). Wiley: 78–86. doi:10.1525/aa.2005.107.1.078. ISSN 1548-1433.

- Dowie, Mark (2009). Conservation Refugees: The Hundred-Year Conflict between Global Conservation and Native Peoples. The MIT Press. ISBN 9780262260626.
- Nadasdy, Paul (2005). "Transcending the Debate over the Ecologically Noble Indian: Indigenous Peoples and Environmentalism". Ethnohistory. 52 (2). Duke University Press: 291–331. doi:10.1215/00141801-52-2-291. ISSN 1527-5477.
- Buege, Douglas; et al. (1996). "The Ecologically Noble Savage Revisited". Environmental Ethics. 18 (1). Center for Environmental Philosophy: 71–88. doi:10.5840/enviroethics199618144.
- Ellingson, Ter (2001). The Myth of the Noble Savage. University of California Press. ISBN 9780520226104.
- Hames, Raymond; et al. (2007). "The Ecologically Noble Savage Debate". Annual Review of Anthropology. 36 (9). Annual Reviews: 177–190. doi:10.1146/annurev.anthro.35.081705.123321. ISSN 0084-6570. SSRN 1051861.

- Kirch, Patrick (2005). "Archaeology and Global Change: The Holocene Record". Annual Review of Environment and Resources. 30. Annual Reviews: 409–440. doi:10.1146/annurev.energy.29.102403.140700. ISSN 1543-5938.
- Roosevelt, Anna Curtenius; et al. (2013). "The Amazon and the Anthropocene: 13,000 Years of Human Influence in a Tropical Rainforest". Anthropocene. 4. Elsevier: 69–87. doi:10.1016/j.ancene.2014.05.001. ISSN 2213-3054.
- Nelson, Michael; Callicott, J. Baird, eds. (2008). The Wilderness Debate Rages On: Continuing the Great New Wilderness Debate. University of Georgia Press. ISBN 9780820331713.
- Denevan, William M. (1992). "The Pristine Myth: The Landscape of the Americas in 1492". Annals of the Association of American Geographers. 82 (3). Association of American Geographers: 369–385. doi:10.1111/j.1467-8306.1992.tb01965.x. ISSN 0004-5608. JSTOR 2563351.
- Denevan, William M. (2011). "The Pristine Myth Revisited". Geographical Review. 101 (4). American Geographical Society: 576–591. doi:10.1111/j.1931-0846.2011.00118.x. ISSN 0016-7428.
- Cronon, William (1995). "The Trouble with Wilderness; or, Getting Back to the Wrong Nature" (PDF). In Cronon, William (ed.). Uncommon Ground: Toward Reinventing Nature. W. W. Norton. pp. 69–90. ISBN 9780393038729.
- Callicott, J. Baird (2000). "Contemporary Criticisms of the Received Wilderness Idea". USDA Forest Service Proceedings. -1 (RMRS-P-15). U.S. Department of Agriculture: 24–31.
- Redford, Kent H. (1993) [1990]. "The Ecologically Noble Savage". In Haviland, W.A.; Gordon, R.J. (eds.). Talking About People: Readings in Contemporary Cultural Anthropology. Mayfield Publishing Company. pp. 11–13. ISBN 9781559341417. Redford's chapter was originally published in 1990 in Orion Nature Quarterly, vol 9 issue 3, pp. 24‍–‍29.
- Clary, Mike; et al. (3 June 1999). "From Everglades Defender to Developer, Tribe Is Stepping Out". Los Angeles Times.
