= ELQ =

ELQ may refer to:

- Ecology Law Quarterly, an environmental law journal
- ELQ, the IATA code for Prince Naif bin Abdulaziz International Airport, Buraidah, Saudi Arabia
