= Amy Oppenheimer =

American lawyer

- Born: December 30, 1952 (age 73); New York City
- Education: Juris Doctor
- Alma mater: University of California at Berkeley
- Occupation: Lawyer
- Years active: 1996–present
- Known for: Workplace investigation

Amy Johanna Oppenheimer (born December 30, 1952) is an American lawyer. She is a pioneer in the field of investigating workplace harassment and led the founding of the Association of Workplace Investigators. She was Chair of the Labor and Employment Section of the State Bar of California. She is founding partner of Oppenheimer Investigations Group LLP. Oppenheimer is also a playwright and actor.

== Early life and education ==
=== Family ===
Oppenheimer was born in New York City to Peter Oppenheimer and Muriel Wolfson. She has two older brothers. Her brother David is also a lawyer. Oppenheimer is a granddaughter of businessman Harvey C. Oppenheimer and Amy Vorhaus. She is named after her grandmother, who had died shortly before her granddaughter was born. Her grandfather remarried Lilian Oppenheimer, who thus became her step-grandmother. Bernard Vorhaus, younger brother of Amy Vorhaus, is her grand-uncle.

=== Education ===
In her early years, Oppenheimer pursued acting, attending the American Academy of Dramatic Arts when she was in elementary school and the American Mime Theater when she was in High School.

Oppenheimer attended and graduated from New Lincoln School and started college at Goddard College. In 1971 she moved to California where her brother lived. Oppenheimer received an undergraduate degree with great distinction and Phi Beta Kappa from the University of California at Berkeley and a Juris Doctor from the University of California at Davis. She received a Reginald Heber Smith Community Lawyer Fellowship to work with battered women in Southwestern Virginia (1980–1981).

== Career ==
After doing poverty law working for Legal Services in Virginia for four years, Oppenheimer returned to California and started her own firm representing plaintiffs in employment discrimination suits, including sexual harassment cases. With her law partner Leslie Levy, between 1989 and 1991 Oppenheimer represented tenants in the case against Fairfield North Apartments and their apartment manager, reaching an at the time unprecedented settlement for sexual harassment in housing. She also did pioneering work in the area of lesbian custody and family law.

Later she moved to mediation and prevention of harassment and investigated Equal Employment Opportunity complaints. Oppenheimer served as administrative law judge at the California Unemployment Insurance Appeals Board from 1992 to 2011.

Oppenheimer started her law firm, the Law Offices of Amy Oppenheimer, in the 1990s. In 2011 she retired as a judge. Out of her law firm grew in 2021 the Oppenheimer Investigations Group LLP, a partnership specializing in workplace investigations.

In 2017, the California State Senate faced allegations of having a work environment with a pervasive culture of sexual harassment. Oppenheimer was invited as an expert to address the meeting of the State Senate Joint Committee on Rules and Subcommittee on Sexual Harassment Prevention and Response that was discussing a change in the system to deal with sexual harassment complaints. The Law Offices of Amy Oppenheimer were also retained by the Senate of the State of California to conduct investigations into allegations about harassment in the State Senate.

Oppenheimer participated in the discussion about sexual harassment in the workplace that followed the MeToo movement in 2018.

== Association of Workplace Investigators ==
In 2009, Oppenheimer led the founding of the California Association of Workplace Investigators, a professional association. She was the first chairperson of the board, serving in that capacity from 2009 to 2012. At the first Board meeting, a Guiding Principles Committee was established. In 2012, the Guiding Principles for Investigators Conducting Impartial Workplace Investigations were adopted by the Association members. In 2011, the Association dropped California from its name and was open for members worldwide. In 2024, the Association had over 2000 members and chapters in Australia, Canada, New Zealand and South Africa.

== Playwright and actor ==
After her retirement as a lawyer, Oppenheimer retook her acting passion. She wrote and performed the one-woman show Looking for justice (in all the wrong places). The show was part of the Capital Fringe Festival and the Minnesota Fringe Festival in 2024. Oppenheimer presented her show at The Marsh in San Francisco in December 2024.

== Publications (selection) ==
- Investigating Workplace Harassment: How to Be Fair, Thorough, and Legal (2002). With Craig Pratt. Society for Human Resource Management. ISBN 9781586440305
- Making the Best Use of Liability Experts in Discrimination and Harassment Litigation (2003), Employment Litigation Reporter, October 2003, vol. 18 no. 5
- Investigating Workplace Harassment and Discrimination (2004), Employee Relations Law Journal Spring 2004, vol. 29 no. 4
- Unconscious biases: What we don´t know can hurt us and others (2015). California Labor & Employment Law Review, November 2015, vol. 29 no. 6
- Privacy, transparency, legitimacy (2016), paper presented at the 68 Annual Meeting of the National Academy of Arbitrators
- Workplace harassment investigations worldwide (2019). AWI Journal, September 2019, vol. 10 no. 3
- The meaning of "due process" in harassment investigations (2019). With Alezah Trigueros. California Labor & Employment Law Review, November 2019, vol. 33 no. 6
- Investigating sexual harassment, in: The Global #MeToo Movement (2020) by Ann. M. Noel and David B. Oppenheimer, Full Court Press.
- Attorneys conducting impartial workplace investigations investigations: reclaiming the independent lawyer role (2022). With Lindsey Harris. California Labor & Employment Law Review, September 2022, vol. 36 no. 5

== Personal life ==
Oppenheimer is partnered with Jennifer Krebs since 1984. They married as soon as same-sex marriage became legal. They have two children, Talia and Adin Krebs-Oppenheimer.
