= Harvard Journal of Law & Public Policy =

- Discipline: Law
- Language: English

Publication details
- History: 1978–present
- Publisher: Harvard Society for Law & Public Policy, Inc. (United States)
- Frequency: Triannual

Standard abbreviations
- Bluebook: Harv. J.L. & Pub. Pol'y
- ISO 4: Harv. J. Law Public Policy

Indexing
- ISSN: 0193-4872 (print); 2374-6572 (web)
- LCCN: 79643593
- OCLC no.: 4301245

Links
- Journal homepage; Journal page at Harvard Law School

The Harvard Journal of Law & Public Policy (JLPP) is a law review at Harvard Law School published by an independent student group. It has served as the flagship journal of the Federalist Society. Established by Spencer Abraham and Stephen Eberhard in 1977 at Harvard Law School, it is one of the most widely circulated law reviews in the United States.

== History ==
In 1977, Harvard Law Students Spencer Abraham and Stephen Eberhard established the journal as a conservative and libertarian alternative against liberal publications on campus. It published the proceedings at the 1982 Yale Law School conference which would found the Federalist Society, and the journal became the organization's official publication. Eberhard described the first volume of the journal as Vox clamantis in deserto (Latin: "a voice crying out in the wilderness").

In the October term of 2018, the journal was cited in the 5th most Supreme Court opinions, finishing ahead of flagship journals such as the Yale Law Journal and the Stanford Law Review.

In August 2021, the journal debuted an online counterpart to the print journal titled JLPP: Per Curiam. Because of the lack of restrictions from the strict print publication schedule of the physical journal, the online portion allows for commentary on current and pressing issues.

== Alumni and authors ==
Notable alumni include Neil Gorsuch, Ted Cruz, Tom Cotton, Alexander Acosta, Mike Pompeo, David Barron, Rachel Brand, Ron DeSantis, Jennifer Walker Elrod, John K. Bush, Joseph D. Kearney, Kevin Newsom, Gregory G. Katsas, Adrian Vermeule, Orin Kerr, Sarah Isgur, and David Frum.

Past authors have included George H. W. Bush, Guido Calabresi, Ted Cruz, Viet D. Dinh, Frank H. Easterbrook, Richard Garnett, Robert P. George, Douglas H. Ginsburg, Lino Graglia, Alex Kozinski, George L. Priest, William H. Pryor Jr., Neomi Rao, William Rehnquist, Antonin Scalia, Eugene Scalia, Clarence Thomas, Ron Paul, and John Yoo.

== See also ==
- List of law reviews in the United States
- New York University Journal of Law & Liberty
- Texas Review of Law and Politics
- Georgetown Journal of Law and Public Policy
