= Luke Cole =

American environmental lawyer

Luke Winthrop Cole
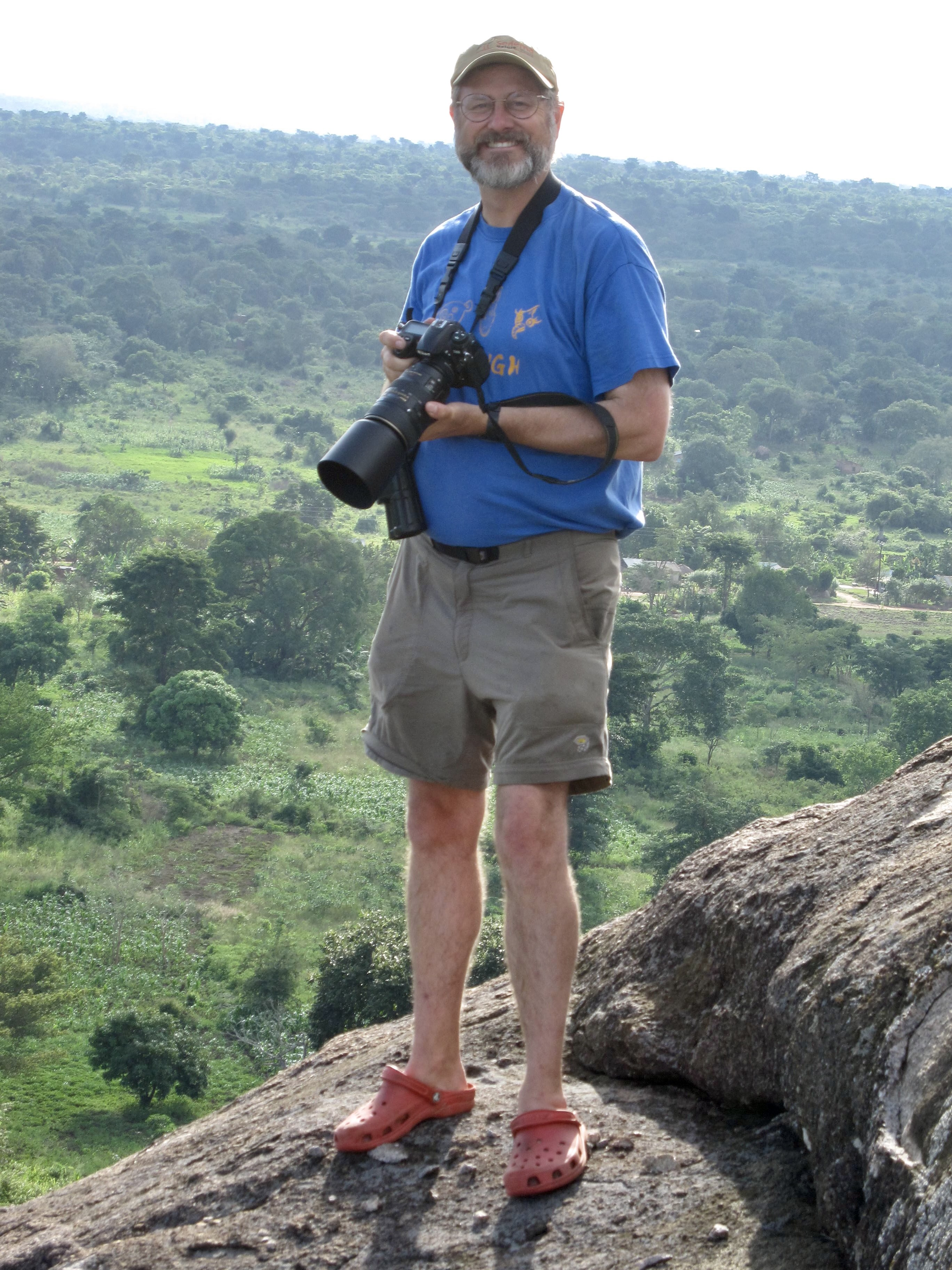
- Luke Cole in Uganda 2009
- Born: July 15, 1962; North Adams, Massachusetts
- Died: June 6, 2009 (aged 46); Queen Elizabeth National Park, Uganda
- Education: Stanford University; Harvard Law School
- Occupation: Environmental lawyer

Luke Winthrop Cole (July 15, 1962 – June 6, 2009) was an American environmental lawyer and the co-founder of the Center on Race, Poverty & the Environment, in San Francisco, California. He was a pioneer in the environmental justice movement.

== Education and personal life ==
Luke Winthrop Cole was born on July 15, 1962, in North Adams, Massachusetts, to Herbert Cole and Alexandra Chappell Cole. Cole was raised with his three siblings, Peter, Thomas, and Sarah in Manhattan, and Nigeria then moved to Santa Barbara in 1968 as a result of his fathers career. In the 1972–1973 school year Cole spent the year split between Ghana and Kenya. Cole graduated high school from the Phillips Academy, a private boarding school in Andover Massachusetts.

Herbert Cole, Lukes father, was an emeritus professor of art history at UC Santa Barbara. While his mother Alexandra Cole, was an architectural preservationist.

Cole graduated with honors from Stanford University in 1984 gaining a political science degree in the process. While at Stanford University Cole was a member of the Delta Upsilon fraternity. Cole graduated cum laude from Harvard Law School in 1989. While at Harvard Law School Cole developed a reputation for his student activism.

Cole and his wife Nancy Shelby, gave birth to Zane Shelby, who now is a computational research engineer at MIT for the Department of Brain and Cognitive Sciences.

Cole died while on a sabbatical with his wife Nancy Shelby, who sustained an eye injury on June 6, 2009, in a car crash in Queen Elizabeth National Park, Uganda. Cole's interest outside of law included ornothology (particularly in Africa), which was the reason for his 2009, trip to Uganda.

== Career ==
Between his undergraduate and law studies (1984–1987), Cole worked under Ralph Nader editing a consumer advocate newsletter. His father Herbert Cole described this period as what "solidifed his affinity for the less fortunate of the world .... [and] spurred him onto the law".

In the fall of 1989, Cole would Co-found the Center on Race, Poverty, and the Environment with his longtime mentor and fellow environmental lawyer Ralph Abascal of California Rural Legal Assistance. Cole also co-founded and edited the journal, Race, Poverty & the Environment with Carl Anthony.

From 1996 to 2000 Cole served on the United States Environmental Protection Agency's, National Environmental and Justice Advisory Council.

Cole taught courses in environmental justice at UC Berkeley, UC Hastings and Stanford Law.

== Legal work ==
=== El Pueblo Para el Aire y Agua Limpio v. County of Kings (1991) ===
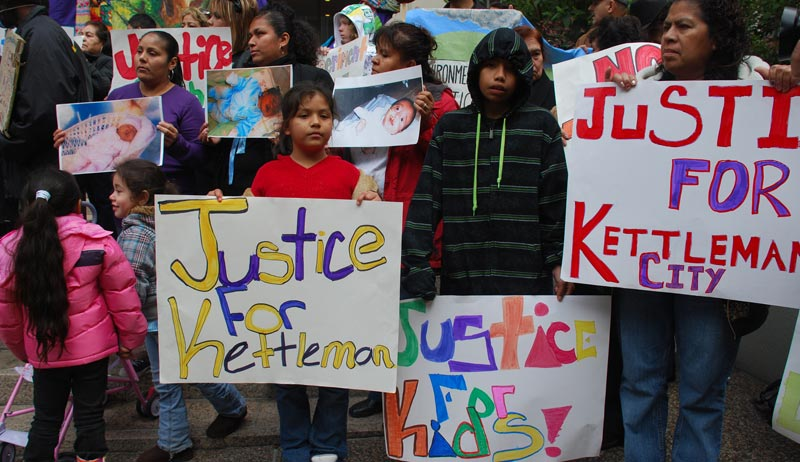
Citizens of Kettleman City protesting

Cole served as a petitioner on the side of El Pueblo Para el Aire y Agua Limpio, who challenged the application of a permit to build a hazardous waste incinerator in Kettleman Hills of Kings County California. They alleged that the decision was based on invalid information. The invalid information pertains to, an environmental impact report claiming the incinerator complied with the California Environmental Quality Act, and that the project was consistent with Kings County general planning and zoning ordinance. With the use of a Final Subsequent Environmental Impact Report (FSEIR) the court discovered that the incinerator would contribute to air pollution of the San Joaquin Air basin, and the pollution could not be mitigated to a level of insignificance with the methods provided. The court also discerned that there is a strong emphasis on environmental decision making my local officials. This would include informing constitutants of environmental plans, which Kings County did not provide for Spanish speaking residents. The monolingual population of Kettleman is roughly forty percent Spanish, who were vocal in an effort to for participation in environmental decisions. The California Supreme Court sided with the citizens of Kettleman and filed an injunction for the permit.

=== South Camden Citizens v. New Jersey Department of Environmental Protection (2001) ===
On behalf of the citizens of South Camden New Jersey, Luke Cole and the Center on Race, Poverty and the Environment (CRPE) sued the New Jersey Department of Environmental Protection (NJDEP) on the basis of a disparate adverse impact of zoning, and air permits granted to St. Lawrence Cement Co. (SLC). Cole and the CRPE alleged violations of title VI section 601, of the Civil Rights Act of 1964, by the NJDEP. The Citizens of South Camden argued that due to the direct impact of trucking routes through residential communities (200 Cement trucks a day), and the exposure to articulate matter, mercury, lead, manganese, nitrogen oxides, carbon monoxide, sulfur oxides, and volatile organic compounds emitted by the SLC's granulated blast furnace slag grinding facility, they unreasonably interfere with the enjoyment of their homes, and caused harm and is a nuissance. With witness testimony from a Dr.Hazen a scientist for the NJDEP, discovering the fact the NJDEP created a pollution screening test to find areas that are exposed to pollutants on the basis of geographic area and ethnic race, finding they were exposed to "above average" level of pollutants. With Dr. Hazen even saying "African Americans and Hispanic Americans… had more than average exposure to air toxics". The United States District Court in New Jersey ruled in favor of the South Camden Citizens, Cole, and the CRPE in 2001. This has been overturned (2006) due to a precedent set after that individuals did not have the right to bring a claim of anti-discrimination regulations, only the federal government.

==== Kivalina Relocation Planning Committee v. Teck Cominco Alaska Inc. (2009) ====
Cole represented the community of Kivalina, Alaska in their suit against Teck Cominco Alaska for alleged erosion and destruction of Kivalina's natural environment forcing the relocation of approximately 400 residents. Kivalina's (an Inupiat Eskimo village who is self-governing, and a federally recognized tribe) complaint alleges due to global warming, the reduction of arctic sea ice that protects the village from winter storms. Cole sought damages from 24 corporations under the federal common law of nuisance, the state law of nuisance Civil Conspiracy and Concert of Action, based on their alleged contribution to excessive emission of carbon dioxide, methane, and other greenhouse gases causing global warming. Plaintiff's alleged the cost of relocation would be a range of 95-400 million dollars. The case was dismissed from the U.S. District court, but was settled out of court and Teck Cominco Alaska Inc was called upon to stop depositing mining tailings into the Kivalina river and must build a pipeline to the ocean 50 miles away. Cole passed away while defending Kivalina in other related environmental cases.

== Impact ==
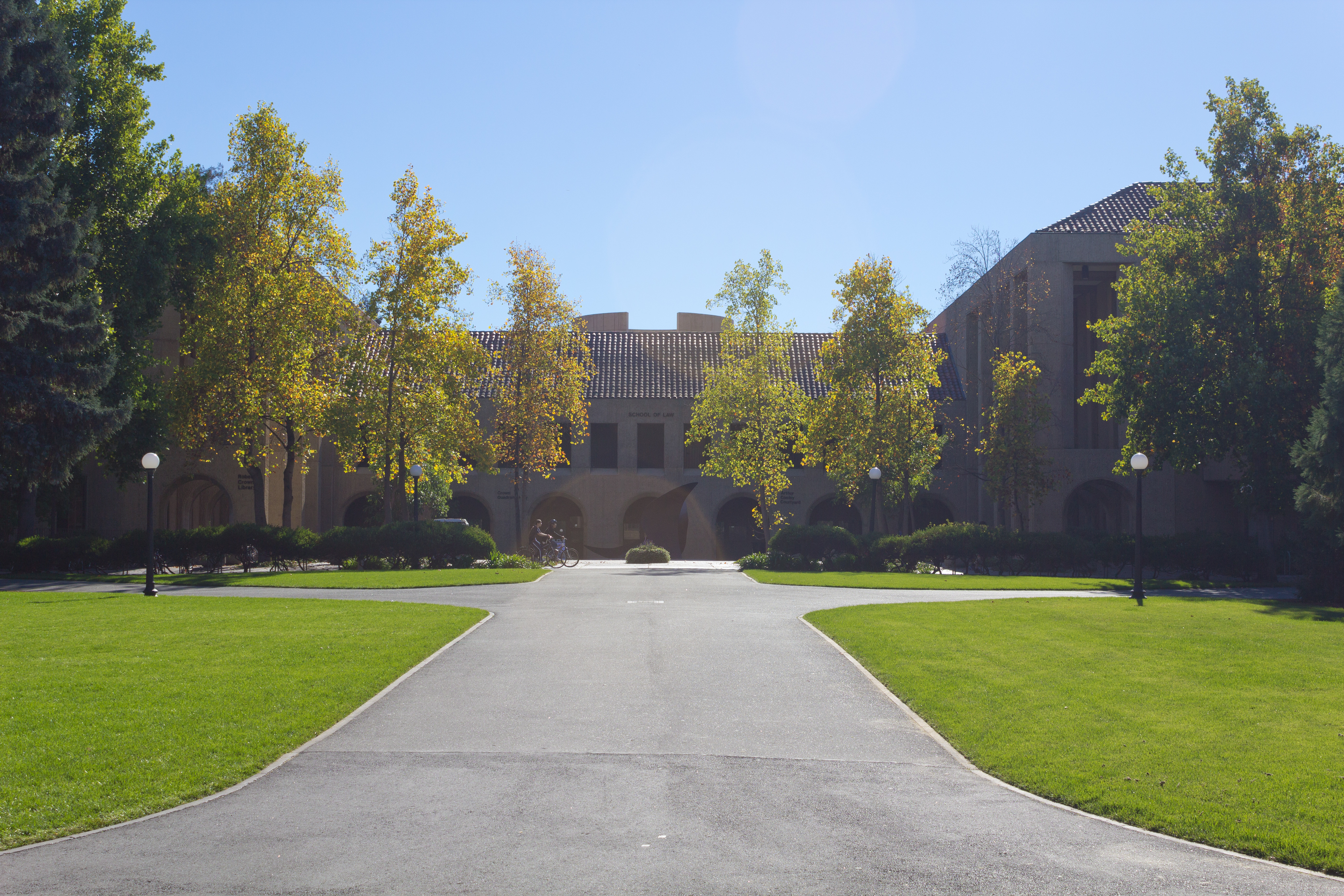
Stanford Law School

In 2009 Stanford Law School opened the Luke W. Cole Professorship and Directorship of the Stanford Law Clinic, endowed by John and Marsha Kleinheinz, who were close friends of Cole. The professorship "will enable Stanford law to continue its deep commitment to the advancement of clinical education and promote scholarship and teaching in public interest law."

Cole co-founded the Center on Race, Poverty and the Environment as an 501(c)(3) Public Charity meaning its non-profit and for a specific charitable cause. The IRS NTEE codes used to classify the organization are, (R20) meaning "Civil Rights, Advocacy for specific groups", and (R01) meaning "Alliance/Advocacy organization".

== Publications ==
- Cole, Luke; Foster, Sheila (2001). From the Ground Up: Environmental Racism and the Rise of the Environmental Justice Movement. New York: NYU Press. ISBN 9780814715376..
- Cole, Luke; Glover, Steven; Terrill, Scott; Rogers, Michael (2005). Middle Pacific Coast, North American Birds. Colorado Springs: Volume 59, Issue 1.

== Awards ==
- Environmental Leadership Award (1997) – UC Berkeley's Ecology Law Quarterly.
- Award for Excellence in Environmental, Energy, and Resources Stewardship (2009) – American Bar Association
