= JIR =

JIR may refer to:

- JiR, a Monte Carlo-based motorcycle racing
- Jewish Institute of Religion
- Journal of Interpretation Research
- Journal of Irreproducible Results
