= Environs (journal) =

- Discipline: Environmental law
- Language: English
- Edited by: Lauren Murvihill, Alexander Jurenka

Publication details
- History: 1977-present
- Publisher: University of California, Davis
- Frequency: Biannually

Standard abbreviations
- Bluebook: Environs
- ISO 4: Environs

Indexing
- ISSN: 0193-6387
- LCCN: 79643414
- OCLC no.: 05225494

Links
- Journal homepage

Environs: Environmental Law and Policy Journal, is a student-run law review published twice per year at the University of California, Davis School of Law. The journal primarily covers environmental law and policy and related subjects with a regional focus in California.

== Overview ==
The journal was established in 1977 as Environs, a "clearinghouse for the dissemination of all environmental information relevant to the Solano-Yolo-Sacramento tri-county area." Early editions of the journal were published in an "informal" style and did not utilize "legalese." In 1989, the journal obtained its current name to reflect its broader focus and the inclusion of "non-legal policy articles" in future publications. In 2016, Washington and Lee University's Law Journal Rankings placed Environs among the top thirty environmental, natural resources, and land use law journals with the highest impact factor.

== Abstracting and indexing ==
The journal is abstracted or indexed in HeinOnline, LexisNexis, Westlaw, and the University of Washington's Current Index to Legal Periodicals. Tables of contents are also available through Infotrieve and Ingenta.

== See also ==
- List of environmental law journals
- List of law reviews in the United States
