= Tennessee Law Review =

- Discipline: Law
- Language: English
- Edited by: Students from the University of Tennessee College of Law

Publication details
- History: 1922–present
- Publisher: Tennessee Law Review Association (United States)
- Frequency: Quarterly

Standard abbreviations
- Bluebook: Tenn. L. Rev.
- ISO 4: Tenn. Law Rev.

Indexing
- ISSN: 0040-3288
- LCCN: 26020201
- OCLC no.: 818994034

Links
- Journal homepage; Online archive; Access via heinonline; Social Science Research Network archive

Tennessee Law Review began in 1922 and is published by the Tennessee Law Review Association which is based within the University of Tennessee College of Law, Knoxville. The journal is published quarterly and edited is by University of Tennessee Law students.

== See also ==
- List of law reviews in the United States
