= Organization & Environment =

- Discipline: Sustainability management and policy, Environmental Studies
- Language: English
- Edited by: Minna Halme, Stefan Schaltegger

Publication details
- Former names: Industrial Crisis Quarterly, Industrial & Environmental Crisis Quarterly
- History: 1987 (39 years ago)–present
- Publisher: SAGE Publications
- Frequency: Quarterly
- Impact factor: 8.1 (2025)

Standard abbreviations
- ISO 4: Organ. Environ.

Indexing
- CODEN: ORENFX
- ISSN: 1086-0266 (print); 1552-7417 (web)
- LCCN: 97652883
- OCLC no.: 300182389

Links
- Journal homepage; Online access; Online archive

Organization & Environment (O&E) is a peer-reviewed academic journal that covers the fields of "management, organizations, and environmental sustainability." The current Editors-in-Chief are Minna Halme (Aalto University) and Stefan Schaltegger (Leuphana University of Lüneburg). Formerly it was Michael Russo (University of Oregon). The journal was established in 1987 and is published by SAGE Publications; it is associated with the Group of Research on Organizations and the Natural Environment (GRONEN).

== Abstracting and indexing ==
Organization & Environment is abstracted and indexed in Scopus and the Social Sciences Citation Index. The journal's Impact Factor for year 2025 was 8.1.

== History ==
Under the editorship of founding co-editor John M. Jermier and a number of editors, the journal took an interdisciplinary direction, playing host to a variety of perspectives including critical organization theory and radical ecology. Collaboration between members of the Organization and Natural Environment section of the Academy of Management and the Section on Environment and Technology section of the American Sociological Association was at the heart of the journal's framework. During this period O&E became a prominent outlet for environmental sociology, publishing articles both from established and world-renowned environmental thinkers and younger scholars who would later become leaders in environmental sociology. The journal played an important role in increasing the influence of environmental sociology within the larger discipline.

=== Editors ===
The following persons have been (co-)editors of the journal:

- Paul Shrivastava (founding co-editor, Concordia University)
- John M. Jermier (founding co-editor, University of South Florida), 1997-2012
- John Bellamy Foster (University of Oregon), 1996-2001
- Richard York (University of Oregon), 2006-2012
- J. Alberto Aragon-Correa (University of Granada), 2012–2016
- Mark Starik (San Francisco State University), 2012–2016
- Maurizio Zollo (Bocconi University), 2016-2019
- Mike Russo (University of Oregon), 2020–2025
- Minna Halme (Aalto University), 2025–present
- Stefan Schaltegger (Leuphana University of Lüneburg), 2025–present

== Editorial transition ==
On December 1, 2012, Alberto Aragon-Correa and Mark Starik became the editors of Organization & Environment. The research mission of the journal currently is to publish "rigorous and impactful research at the intersection of management, organizations, and environmental sustainability". The impact factor since that point has risen, submissions have expanded, and the journal has become more selective.

=== Criticism ===
The December 2012 editorial transition was strongly criticized by (now former) editorial board members of Organization & Environment as an "editorial coup" on the part of Sage and GRONEN. According to one account, the editorial transition was decided upon and carried out by Sage independently of its editors and editorial board, without their prior knowledge or acceptance. In a statement published in October 2012, 25 members of the editorial board of O&E resigned in protest of the transition.
