= UC Law Environmental Journal =

- Discipline: Environmental law
- Language: English
- Edited by: Ethan Pawson and Kimberly Willis (2018-19)

Publication details
- History: 1994-present
- Publisher: University of California Law, San Francisco
- Frequency: Biannually

Standard abbreviations
- Bluebook: U.C.L. Env't J.
- ISO 4: UC Law Environ. J.

Indexing
- ISSN: 1080-0735
- LCCN: 96657139
- OCLC no.: 818986639

Links
- Journal homepage

The UC Law Environmental Journal is a student-run law review published at the University of California Law, San Francisco. Founded in 1994, the journal primarily covers environmental law and policy and related subjects with a regional focus in California, the Pacific Northwest, Alaska and Hawai'i.

== History and overview ==
The journal was established in 1994 as a regional journal "that would contribute to an integrated understanding of environmental and natural resources policy." The founding editors had the goal of establishing an "interdisciplinary journal" that would feature "articles by legal scholars, practicing lawyers, biologists, economists, engineers, historians, hydrologists, land and resource managers, and other professionals." It is among several regional environmental law journals to focus specifically on issues related to California and the Pacific Northwest.

Although the journal primarily covers environmental law and policy, it includes complementary fields, such as economics, anthropology, regional planning, engineering, biology, and Earth sciences. The journal also features photography and other artwork relating to nature and the environment in California, Alaska, the Pacific Northwest, and Hawai'i, . The journal has also published works of fiction, poetry, and other non-fiction. In 2008, the journal published an anthology of its "most important" articles to honor Joseph Sax's award of the 2007 Blue Planet Prize. The journal has also been a sponsor of the annual California Water Law Symposium.

From 2017 to 2023, the journal was known as the Hastings Environmental Law Journal. It no longer publishes poetry and fiction, although it continues to have an interdisciplinary approach. Since 2023, it has been known as "UC Law Environmental Journal."

== Influence ==
Washington and Lee University's 2008-2015 Law Journal Rankings place the journal among the top thirty law journals that specialize in environmental, natural resources, and land use law. Articles appearing in the journal have been cited by many state supreme courts in published decisions. Articles also appear in many legal treatises, including American Jurisprudence, American Law Reports, and Westlaw practice guides.

== Alternate titles ==
- The Spring 1994 edition of West-Northwest (Vol. 1, No. 1) was titled West-Northwest Journal of Environmental Law, Policy, Thought.
- From Volume 2 though Volume 23, the journal was titled Hastings West-Northwest Journal of Environmental Law and Policy.

== Abstracting and indexing ==
The journal is abstracted or indexed in HeinOnline, LexisNexis, Westlaw, and the University of Washington's Current Index to Legal Periodicals. Tables of contents are also available through Ingenta. As of July 2015, the University of California Law, San Francisco plans to make available full-text reprints of articles at the university's online scholarship repository.

== See also ==
- List of law journals
- List of environmental law journals
