= San Diego Journal of Climate and Energy Law =

- Discipline: Climate and Energy Law
- Language: English
- Edited by: Emma Wellmeyer

Publication details
- History: 2009-present
- Publisher: University of San Diego School of Law
- Frequency: Annually

Standard abbreviations
- Bluebook: San Diego J. Climate & Energy L.
- ISO 4: San Diego J. Clim. Energy Law

Indexing
- ISSN: 2154-9028
- LCCN: 2010250051
- OCLC no.: 501185300

Links
- Journal homepage

The San Diego Journal of Climate and Energy Law is a student-run law review published at the University of San Diego School of Law. The journal primarily publishes articles and comments discussing environmental law and policy with a particular focus on issues relating to climate change and energy.

== History ==
The journal was founded by students at the University of San Diego School of Law who wanted to create the "nation's first student-run law journal focused exclusively on legal aspects of the world's transition to a climate-safe economy." The editor-in-chief of the journal's first issue remarked that he hoped the journal would generate "meaningful discussion that will provide real-world solutions" to problems associated with climate change. The faculty of the university granted approval for the journal in 2008, and the first edition was published in 2009. To generate article submissions for the first issue, the journal's editorial board hosted a symposium on topics relating to climate change and energy law.

== Overview ==
The journal publishes scholarship relating to climate change and energy law, including "claims related to climate change, law and economics associated with cap-and-trade greenhouse gas markets, new energy policy of the carbon-constrained world, legal implications of trans-border air and water pollution, and effects of climate change on endangered species law." In 2016, Washington and Lee University's Law Journal Rankings placed the journal among the top twenty-five highest ranked environmental, natural resources, and land use law journals by overall score. The journal also hosts an annual symposium on the topic of climate and energy law.

== Abstracting and indexing ==
The journal is abstracted or indexed in EBSCO databases, HeinOnline, LexisNexis, Westlaw, and the University of Washington's Current Index to Legal Periodicals. Tables of contents are also available through Infotrieve and Ingenta, and the journal posts past issues on its website.

== See also ==
- List of law journals
- List of environmental law journals
