= UCLA Journal of Environmental Law and Policy =

- Discipline: Environmental law
- Language: English
- Edited by: Lena Freij and Gabriel Greif

Publication details
- History: 1980–present
- Publisher: University of California, Los Angeles
- Frequency: Biannually

Standard abbreviations
- Bluebook: UCLA J. Envtl. L. & Pol'y
- ISO 4: UCLA J. Environ. Law Policy

Indexing
- ISSN: 0733-401X (print); 1942-8553 (web)
- LCCN: 82644131
- OCLC no.: 07066735

Links
- Journal homepage

The UCLA Journal of Environmental Law and Policy is a student-run law review published at the University of California, Los Angeles, School of Law. The journal primarily publishes articles and comments discussing environmental law and policy and related subjects.

== Overview ==
The journal was established in 1980 with the goal of confronting "those environmental problems which are currently before the public, and to provide a variety of opinions and suggested solutions to the problems." Between 1980 and 1982, each issue of the journal would include a collection of articles focused on a single topic or theme. Beginning with the third volume in the fall of 1982, the journal began including articles on a range of different topics in each individual issue. The journal also collaborates with the Emmett Institute on Climate Change and the Environment to host environmental law symposia.

== Impact ==
In 2016, Washington and Lee University's Law Journal Rankings placed the journal among the top ten environmental, natural resources, and land use law journals with the highest impact factor. Articles in the journal have been cited by several state supreme courts as well as the United States Court of Appeals for the Federal Circuit. Articles also appear in treatises written by American Law Reports and American Jurisprudence.

== Abstracting and indexing ==
The journal is abstracted or indexed in EBSCO databases, HeinOnline, LexisNexis, Westlaw, and the University of Washington's Current Index to Legal Periodicals. Tables of contents are also available through Infotrieve and Ingenta, and the journal posts past issues on its website.

== See also ==
- List of law journals
- List of environmental law journals
