= Julie Roland =

American naval officer and lawyer

Personal details
- Party: Democratic
- Education: University of Pennsylvania; University of San Diego (JD); Columbia University (LLM)
- Occupation: Columnist, Military officer

Military service
- Allegiance: United States
- Branch/service: United States Navy
- Years of service: 2015–2025
- Rank: Lieutenant Commander

Julie Roland is an American public servant, writer, and retired naval officer. She served as a helicopter pilot in the United States Navy until she retired in 2025. Roland is a columnist with The Fulcrum.

== Education ==
Roland earned an bachelor's degree in history from the University of Pennsylvania. She earned a juris doctor from the University of San Diego School of Law. She also has a master's degree in global business law from Columbia University.

=== Military ===
Roland served active duty in the United States Navy for over a decade, deploying to the South China Sea and the Persian Gulf as a Navy helicopter pilot. She flew MH-60R aircraft, used in anti-submarine and surface warfare. She also served as an aviation certifying officer at Afloat Training Group San Diego.

She resigned from her military commission on June 2, 2025.

=== Law, politics, and public service ===
While in law school, Roland served as a consultant to the University of San Diego School of Law's Children's Advocacy Institute, worked for The Legal Aid Society of San Diego, and served as president of the Public Interest Law Foundation.

In California, she was a member of the San Diego Leadership Alliance, the League of Women Voters, Women's Foundation California, the Rotary Club, and the Young Professionals Council of the The San Diego LGBT Community Center. She was appointed by the Mayor of San Diego to serve on the Mission Bay Park Committee and served in that position for two years. Roland later joined the board of the Pacific Beach town council, the board of the San Diego Women's Foundation, and served on the philanthropy committee of the Girl Scouts of San Diego.

While attending Columbia University in New York City, Roland worked as the district director for a member of the New York State Assembly. She is a member of the Junior League of New York and the Truman National Security Project and serves on the executive committee of the Lexington Democratic Club.

In September 2026 Roland became the Political Director of IBEW 569 of San Diego.

For her service to her community, Roland received a Woman of Impact Award from Assemblymember Tasha Boerner and a Woman Who Inspires Award from Senator Blakespear. Julie was also the recipient of the James A. D’Angelo Outstanding Child Advocate Award and the Wiley W. Manuel Certificate for Pro Bono Legal Services, in addition to several military medals. In 2025, San Diego Business Journal named Roland one of their 40 Next Top Business Leaders Under 40.

=== Writing ===
Roland has written about politics, military policy, children's advocacy, and the environment various publications, including the The New York Times, and is a columnist for The Fulcrum.

== Personal life ==
Roland is from Berkeley, California. She is Jewish and Queer.

She is a member of the Academy of Magical Arts and has performed internationally as a magician.
