= Columbia Journal of Environmental Law =

- Discipline: Environmental law
- Language: English
- Edited by: Ashley Gregor

Publication details
- History: 1974-present
- Publisher: Columbia University
- Frequency: Biannually

Standard abbreviations
- Bluebook: Colum. J. Envtl. L.
- ISO 4: Columbia J. Environ. Law

Indexing
- ISSN: 0098-4582
- LCCN: 775643962
- OCLC no.: 57832456

Links
- Journal homepage

The Columbia Journal of Environmental Law is a student-run law review published at Columbia University's School of Law. The journal primarily publishes articles, notes, and book reviews discussing environmental law and policy and related subjects.

== History ==
The journal was established in 1974 as an "outgrowth of the activities of the student Environmental Law Council" at Columbia Law School. In the introduction to the first edition of the journal, Columbia Law School Dean Michael I. Sovern stated that he hoped the journal would serve as "training grounds" to help environmental lawyers "learn their craft." Sovern also remarked that environmental scholarship had "passed the long, dark years when those concerned with the environment were considered kooks" and he assured readers that the journal would not be "recycled" like another "long-gone New York newspaper." In opening remarks for the twenty-fifth anniversary edition of the journal, a member of the journal's board of directors suggested that future authors would need to confront "second-generation environmental problems" that would be "more complex" than problems in the past.

== Overview ==
The journal publishes scholarship relating to "a range of topics from civil rights to the Securities and Exchange Commission, all concerning some aspect of environmental law and policy." In addition to its usual selection of articles, notes, and book reviews, the journal has also published articles relating to symposia hosted by the journal and Columbia Law School. However, in 2014, the journal began publishing an online issue dedicated to the journal's annual Climate Change Symposium.

== Impact ==
In 2016, Washington and Lee University's Law Journal Rankings placed the journal among the top five environmental, natural resources, and land use law journals with the highest impact factor. Articles published in the journal have been cited by the Supreme Court of the United States as well as the Second, Third, Fourth, Sixth, Seventh, Eighth, Ninth, and Tenth Circuit Courts of Appeals. Many state supreme courts have also cited articles from the journal. Articles also appear in many legal treatises, including American Jurisprudence, American Law Reports, and the Restatement of Torts (Third).

== Abstracting and indexing ==
The journal is abstracted or indexed in HeinOnline, LexisNexis, Westlaw, and the University of Washington's Current Index to Legal Periodicals. Tables of contents are also available through Infotrieve and Ingenta, and the journal posts some past issues on its website.

== See also ==
- List of law journals
- List of environmental law journals
