= Journal of Environmental Law and Litigation =

- Discipline: Environmental law
- Language: English
- Edited by: Amber Lesher

Publication details
- History: 1986-present
- Publisher: University of Oregon School of Law
- Frequency: Biannually

Standard abbreviations
- Bluebook: J. Envtl. L. & Litig.
- ISO 4: J. Environ. Law Litig.

Indexing
- ISSN: 1049-0280
- LCCN: 87655779
- OCLC no.: 13326045

Links
- Journal homepage

The Journal of Environmental Law and Litigation is a student-run law review published at University of Oregon School of Law. The journal publishes articles and essays about environmental law, natural resources law, and litigation relating to these fields.

== History and overview ==
The journal was founded in 1986 by participants at the University of Oregon School of Law's Western Public Interest Law Conference. The founding editors intended for the journal to be a forum for scholarship relating to "citizen enforcement of public [environmental] laws." In 1994, the journal began publishing on a biannual basis.

The 2016 Washington and Lee University Law Journal Rankings placed the journal among the twenty five highest rated environmental, natural resources, and land use law journals. Additionally, the journal was ranked among the top eleven environmental, natural resources, and land use law journals most frequently cited by cases. Articles in the journal have been cited by the Second, Third, Eighth, and Ninth Courts of Appeals. Occasionally, the journal has published issues relating to symposia sponsored by the University of Oregon School of Law.

== Abstracting and indexing ==
The journal is abstracted or indexed in EBSCO databases, HeinOnline, LexisNexis, Westlaw, and the University of Washington's Current Index to Legal Periodicals. Tables of contents are also available through Infotrieve and Ingenta, and the journal hosts an archive of past issues on its website.

== See also ==
- List of law journals
- List of environmental law journals
