= Michigan Journal of Environmental and Administrative Law =

Michigan Journal of Environmental & Administrative Law
- Discipline: Administrative and environmental law
- Language: English
- Edited by: Kevin Todd

Publication details
- History: 2012-present
- Publisher: University of Michigan School of Law
- Frequency: Biannually

Standard abbreviations
- Bluebook: Mich. J. Envtl. & Admin. L.
- ISO 4: Mich. J. Environ. Adm. Law

Indexing
- ISSN: 2375-6276
- LCCN: 2012222283
- OCLC no.: 786034934

Links
- Journal homepage

The Michigan Journal of Environmental & Administrative Law is a student-run law review published at the University of Michigan School of Law. The journal publishes articles, notes, comments, and essays relating to administrative and environmental law.

== History and overview ==
The journal was established in 2012 after "years of advocacy [by] environmental law students" at the University of Michigan School of Law. The journal's founding editors had the goal of "prompt[ing] new scholarship and the development of sound public policy approaches in both environmental law and administrative law." In 2016, Washington and Lee University's Law Journal Rankings placed the journal among the top three environmental, natural resources, and land use law journals with the highest impact factor.

== Abstracting and indexing ==
The journal is abstracted or indexed in EBSCO databases, HeinOnline, LexisNexis, Westlaw, and the University of Washington's Current Index to Legal Periodicals. Tables of contents are also available through Infotrieve and Ingenta, and the journal posts past issues on its website.

== See also ==
- List of law journals
- List of environmental law journals
