= Environmental Law (journal) =

- Discipline: Legal Studies
- Language: English

Publication details
- History: 1970 to present
- Publisher: William S. Hein & Co. (United States)
- Frequency: Quarterly (Spring, Summer, Fall, and Winter)

Standard abbreviations
- Bluebook: Envtl. L.
- ISO 4: Environ. Law

Indexing
- ISSN: 0046-2276

Links
- Journal homepage

Environmental Law is a law review focused on environmental and natural resources law published by students at the Lewis & Clark Law School. Founded in 1969, it is the oldest law review covering natural resources and environmental law in the United States. The journal is recognized as a national leader in its field and has featured articles by practitioners, academics, legislators, and justices of the United States Supreme Court.

== Overview ==
Environmental Law publishes four issues each year and contains articles, essays, book reviews by lawyers and academics, and student-written notes and comments. Topics of discussion range from in-depth analysis of recent cases to more abstract discussions of the latest pollution prevention theories. The journal also publishes a Ninth Circuit Review on an annual basis as well as a "letters to the editor" section entitled "Clear the Air". Environmental Law is edited entirely by students.

The "Ninth Circuit Review" surveys recent decisions from the Ninth Circuit involving federal environmental statutes, Native American rights, common law environmental protections, procedural aspects of citizen suits, and all other topics exploring environmental issues. "Clear the Air" provides a forum for critics and skeptics to respond to articles published in the journal. The quick publication schedule for these letters enables researchers and practitioners to solicit answers and information from subscribers.

Professor Scott Crespi ranked Environmental Law as the third most influential environmental law review in the United States, behind Boalt's Ecology Law Quarterly and the Harvard Environmental Law Review.

The journal is printed on unbleached, 100% recycled post-consumer paper with soy ink.

== History ==
Letter from President Richard Nixon

Established in 1969 by Dean Harold Wren and Professor Bill Williamson, Environmental Law was Lewis & Clark Law School’s first law review. The journal was launched amid the growing national awareness of environmental issues and was a catalyst behind the law school’s environmental and natural resources program, which is commonly ranked as the best in the nation.

Throughout the mid-1960s and 1970s, the United States Congress enacted a series of significant environmental laws, including the Wilderness Act, National Environmental Policy Act, Clean Air Act, Clean Water Act, and Endangered Species Act. During this time, President Richard Nixon acknowledged the establishment of the nation's first law review dedicated to environmental law by writing a letter to the journal to thank Lewis & Clark Law School for its participation in the national movement. Environmental Law, President Nixon stated, provided "fresh hope" for answering "the great question" of the Seventies. The letter was republished on the first page of the first volume of Environmental Law and followed by articles by Senator Edmund S. Muskie and Supreme Court Justice William O. Douglas.

== Admissions ==
Members are selected either by virtue of their grades during their first year of law school or by completing an anonymous writing competition, which is held during the summer months. The general membership of the journal determines the number of applicants that may be admitted. Prospective students are required to have a minimum grade point average.

== Selected articles ==
- Bruce Ackerman, The Jurisprudence of Just Compensation, 7 Environmental Law 509 (1977).
- Bruce Babbitt, Federalism and the Environment, 13 Environmental Law 847 (1982).
- Bruce Babbitt, The Public Interest in Western Water, 23 Environmental Law 933 (1993).
- Bruce Babbitt, The Endangered Species Act and Takings, 24 Environmental Law 355 (1994).
- Earl Blumenauer, A New Approach for the New Millennium, 30 Environmental Law 1 (2000).
- Art Buchwald, The Cleanest Shirts in Town, 1 Environmental Law 223 (1971).
- Richard D. Cudahy, Coming of Age in the Environment, 30 Environmental Law 15 (2000).
- William O. Douglas, Environmental Problems of the Oceans: The Need for International Controls, 1 Environmental Law 149 (1971).
- Al Gore, In Memoriam: Edmund Sixtus Muskie, 26 Environmental Law 759 (1996).
- Slade Gorton & Julie Kays, Legislative History of the Timber and Salvage Amendments, 26 Environmental Law 641 (1996).
- Gregory J. Hobbs, Jr., Priority: The Most Misunderstood Stick in the Bundle, 32 Environmental Law 37 (2002).
- Edmund S. Muskie, An Environmental Program For America, 1 Environmental Law 2 (1970).
- Diarmuid F. O'Scannlain, Current Trends in Judicial Review of Environmental Agency Action, 27 Environmental Law 1 (1997).
- Henry Waxman, An Overview of the Clean Air Act Amendments of 1990, 21 Environmental Law 1721 (1991).
- Henry Waxman, et al., Roadmap to Title I of the Clean Air Act Amendments of 1990, 21 Environmental Law 1843 (1992).
- Henry Waxman, et al., Cars, Fuels, and Clean Air: A Review of Title II of the Clean Air Act Amendments of 1990, 21 Environmental Law 1947 (1992).
- Ron Wyden & Joshua Sheinkman, A Road Map for Environmental Law in the Twenty-First Century, 30 Environmental Law 35 (2000).
