= The Columbia Journal of Law & the Arts =

Columbia Journal of Law & the Arts (JLA)
- Discipline: Jurisprudence
- Language: English
- Edited by: Jacob R. Gibbs

Publication details
- Former names: Art and the Law, Columbia-VLA Art and the Law, Columbia-VLA Journal of Law & The Arts
- History: 1975–present
- Publisher: Columbia Law School (United States)
- Frequency: Quarterly

Standard abbreviations
- Bluebook: Colum. J.L. & Arts
- ISO 4: Columbia J. Law Arts

Indexing
- ISSN: 1544-4848 (print); 2161-9271 (web)
- LCCN: 2002250069

Links
- Journal homepage

The Columbia Journal of Law & the Arts (JLA) is a student-edited law review at Columbia Law School and the world's leading journal in copyright and art law. The Journal publishes articles and notes dedicated to in-depth coverage of current legal issues in the art, entertainment, sports, intellectual property, and communications industries. It features contributions by scholars, judges, practitioners, and students.

JLA is affiliated with the Kernochan Center for Law, Media, and the Arts and the Entertainment, Arts, and Sports Law Society at Columbia Law School. Its Board of Advisors currently includes Professor Shyamkrishna Balganesh, June M. Besek, Professor Jane C. Ginsburg, Trey Hatch, Adria G. Kaplan, Philippa Loengard, and David Leichtman. Past members of the Board of Advisors include Gilbert S. Edelson and Morton L. Janklow.

== Impact ==
Founded in 1975, the Columbia Journal of Law & the Arts is devoted to arts, entertainment, and sports law, with 536 journal cites between 2010 and 2017. As of June 2021, the Columbia Journal of Law & the Arts is the highest-ranking secondary journal at Columbia Law School and the highest-ranking journal in the world in its field. JLA's publications have been cited by the numerous courts, including the Supreme Court.

== Leadership ==
Editors-in-Chief (2010–present)
Year	Name
2026-2027	Jacob R. Gibbs
2025–2026	Kaleigh Q. McCormick
2024–2025	Collier N. Curran
2023–2024	Elizabeth Huh
2022–2023	Aileen L. Kim
2021–2022	Benjamin Koslowe
2020–2021	Alec Fisher
2019–2020	Rachel Horn
2018–2019	Caitlin E. Jokubaitis
2017–2018	David Manella
2016–2017	Beatrice Kelly
2015–2016	Zoe Carpou
2014–2015	Jenna Skoller
2013–2014	Abigail Everdell
2012–2013	Jack M. Browning
2011–2012	Jocelyn V. Hanamirian
2010–2011	Lauren Gallo

== See also ==
- List of law journals
- List of law reviews in the United States
- List of intellectual property law journals
