= Journal of Environmental Science and Health, Part C =

- Discipline: Environmental health, cancer
- Language: English
- Edited by: Peter P. Fu

Publication details
- Former name(s): Journal of Environmental Science and Health, Part C: Environmental Carcinogenesis Reviews, Environmental Carcinogenesis Reviews
- History: 1976-present
- Publisher: Taylor & Francis
- Frequency: Biannual
- Impact factor: 3.667 (2015)

Standard abbreviations
- ISO 4: J. Environ. Sci. Health C

Indexing
- CODEN: JSHREB
- ISSN: 1059-0501 (print); 1532-4095 (web)
- LCCN: 2007233275
- OCLC no.: 24465089

Links
- Journal homepage; Online access; Online archive

The Journal of Environmental Science and Health, Part C: Environmental Carcinogenesis and Ecotoxicology Reviews is a biannual peer-reviewed scientific journal covering environmental health as it relates to carcinogenesis and toxicology. It was established in 1976 and is published by Taylor & Francis. The editor-in-chief is Peter P. Fu (National Center for Toxicological Research). According to the Journal Citation Reports, the journal has a 2015 impact factor of 3.667.
