= Toxicology Mechanisms and Methods =

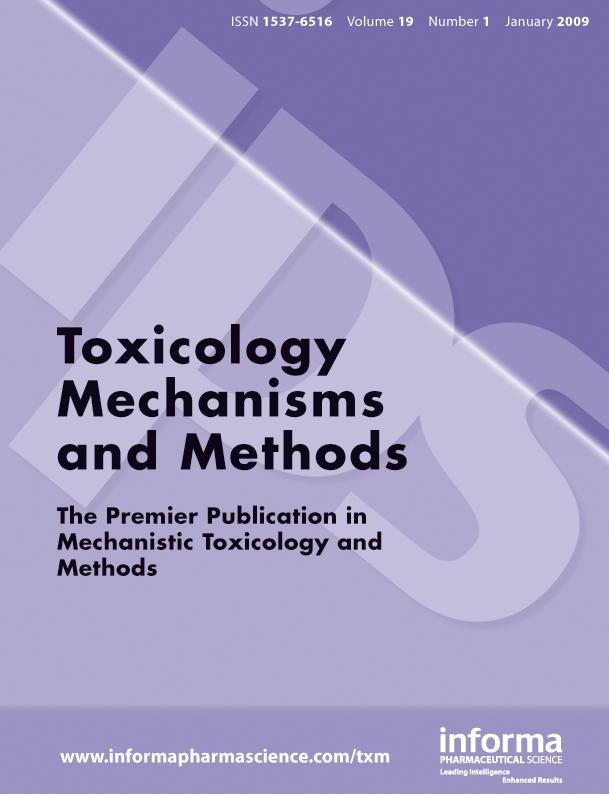
- Discipline: Toxicology
- Language: English
- Edited by: Luis G. Valerio, Jr. Ph.D., ATS

Publication details
- History: 2004-present
- Publisher: Informa
- Frequency: 9/year
- Impact factor: 2.8 (2023)

Standard abbreviations
- ISO 4: Toxicol. Mech. Methods

Indexing
- CODEN: TMMOCP
- ISSN: 1537-6516 (print); 1537-6524 (web)
- LCCN: 2001215311
- OCLC no.: 48251225

Links
- Journal homepage; Online access; Online archive

Toxicology Mechanisms and Methods is a peer-reviewed medical journal covering research on all aspects of toxicology. The editor-in-chief is Luis G. Valerio, Jr., Ph.D., ATS. The journal is published 9 times per year by Informa. According to the Journal Citation Reports, the journal has a 2023 impact factor of 2.8.
