= Juvenile and Family Court Journal =

- Discipline: Juvenile justice, family justice
- Language: English
- Edited by: Joey Orduna Hastings, Melissa Sickmund, Maurice Portley

Publication details
- Former name(s): Juvenile Court Judges Journal, Juvenile Justice, Journal of Juvenile & Family Courts
- History: 1949-present
- Publisher: Wiley
- Frequency: Quarterly
- Impact factor: 0.441 (2020)

Standard abbreviations
- ISO 4: Juv. Fam. Court J.

Indexing
- CODEN: JFCJD6
- ISSN: 1755-6988
- LCCN: 78646713
- OCLC no.: 59161499

Links
- Journal homepage; Online access; Online archive

The Juvenile and Family Court Journal is a quarterly peer-reviewed academic journal covering juvenile and family justice. It was established in 1949 as Juvenile Court Judges Journal, and was later renamed Juvenile Justice, and later renamed again to Journal of Juvenile & Family Courts. The journal obtained its current name in 1978. It is published by Wiley and the National Council of Juvenile and Family Court Judges. The editors-in-chief are Joey Orduna Hastings, Melissa Sickmund, and Maurice Portley. According to the Journal Citation Reports, the journal has a 2020 impact factor of 0.441.
