= New York University Journal of Law & Liberty =

- Cover of a 2018 issue
- Discipline: Law
- Language: English

Publication details
- History: 2005–present
- Publisher: New York University School of Law (United States)
- Frequency: Triannual

Standard abbreviations
- Bluebook: N.Y.U. J.L. & Liberty
- ISO 4: N. Y. Univ. J. Law Lib.

Indexing
- ISSN: 1930-5044 (print); 1932-4421 (web)
- LCCN: 2005250053
- OCLC no.: 759535945

Links
- Journal homepage; Online access at HeinOnline

The New York University Journal of Law & Liberty is a law journal at the New York University School of Law that publishes scholarship related to law and classical liberalism.

== History ==
The journal was established in 2005 by students Robert Sarvis and Robert McNamara. In 2008, an article published by the journal was cited by Justice Antonin Scalia in his majority opinion in the landmark United States Supreme Court case of District of Columbia v. Heller. The journal also presents the annual Friedrich A. von Hayek Lecture jointly with the Classical Liberal Institute of New York University School of Law.

== See also ==
- List of law reviews in the United States
- Harvard Journal of Law and Public Policy
- Libertarian theories of law
