= National Association for Interpretation =

The National Association for Interpretation is a non-profit professional association of natural and cultural resources interpreters, primarily in the United States. It is based in Fort Collins, Colorado.

== Formation ==
NAI was formed in 1988, when the Association of Interpretive Naturalists (founded 1954) and the Western Interpreters Association (founded 1965) merged into a unified organization.

== Activities ==
NAI provides training and certification programs and is recognized as a major source for professional expertise and training in the field. The NAI publishes the Journal of Interpretation Research, a peer-reviewed academic journal. An annual conference and workshop provides professional development, collaboration and networking opportunities.
