= Environmental Ethics (journal) =

- Discipline: Environmental ethics
- Language: English
- Edited by: Allen A. Thompson

Publication details
- History: 1979–present
- Publisher: Philosophy Documentation Center on behalf of the Center for Environmental Philosophy (United States)
- Frequency: Quarterly
- Impact factor: 0.472 (2021)

Standard abbreviations
- ISO 4: Environ. Ethics

Indexing
- CODEN: ENETDD
- ISSN: 0163-4275 (print); 2153-7895 (web)
- LCCN: 79-644567
- OCLC no.: 4372676

Links
- Journal homepage; Journal contents with abstracts

Environmental Ethics is a quarterly peer-reviewed academic journal covering environmental philosophy. It was established in 1979 by the philosopher and an environmentalist Eugene Hargrove, and is published by the Philosophy Documentation Center on behalf of the Center for Environmental Philosophy (University of North Texas). The editor-in-chief is Allan A. Thompson (Oregon State University). In establishing the journal, Hargrove stated that "the journal will not have a specific point of view nor will it advocate anything".

== Abstracting and indexing ==
The journal is abstracted and indexed in:

- ATLA Religion Database
- Biological Abstracts
- BIOSIS Previews
- Current Contents/Social & Behavioral Sciences
- EBSCO databases
- Environmental Engineering Abstracts
- Environmental Science and Pollution Management
- ERIH PLUS
- Expanded Academic ASAP
- International Bibliography of Periodical Literature
- International Philosophical Bibliography
- International Political Science Abstracts
- MLA International Bibliography
- Philosopher's Index
- PhilPapers
- ProQuest databases
- Referativny Zhurnal
- Religious and Theological Abstracts
- Scopus
- Social Sciences Citation Index
- Sociological Abstracts
- The Zoological Record

== Impact ==
According to the Journal Citation Reports, the journal has a 2021 impact factor of 0.472.

== See also ==
- List of ethics journals
- List of philosophy journals
- List of environmental journals
