= Toxicology and Industrial Health =

- Discipline: Toxicology, occupational health
- Language: English
- Edited by: Anthony L. Kiorpes

Publication details
- History: 1985-present
- Publisher: SAGE Publications
- Frequency: 10/year
- Impact factor: 1.688 (2015)

Standard abbreviations
- ISO 4: Toxicol. Ind. Health

Indexing
- CODEN: TIHEEC
- ISSN: 0748-2337 (print); 1477-0393 (web)
- LCCN: 87643067
- OCLC no.: 614161667

Links
- Journal homepage; Online access; Online archive

Toxicology and Industrial Health is a peer-reviewed medical journal that covers research in the fields of occupational health and toxicology. The editor-in-chief is Anthony L. Kiorpes. The journal was established in 1985 and is published by SAGE Publications.

== Abstracting and indexing ==
The journal is abstracted and indexed in Scopus and the Social Sciences Citation Index. According to the Journal Citation Reports, its 2015 impact factor was 1.688.
