= Journal of Technology Law & Policy =

- Discipline: Technology law
- Language: English

Publication details
- History: 1995-present
- Publisher: University of Florida Levin College of Law (United States)
- Frequency: Biannually

Standard abbreviations
- Bluebook: J. Tech. L. & Pol'y
- ISO 4: J. Technol. Law Policy

Indexing
- ISSN: 1087-6995
- OCLC no.: 49948232

Links
- Journal homepage

The Journal of Technology Law & Policy is a law review devoted to discussion and analysis of the legal implications of technology. Topics include, but are not limited to patents, copyrights, trademarks, trade secrets, antitrust, information privacy, and computer law. The journal was established in 1995 and is published twice yearly by the University of Florida Levin College of Law.

In 1999, the journal became fully accredited as an independent academic journal. In 2016, it began publishing its articles online.
