= Stanford Environmental Law Journal =

- Discipline: Environmental law
- Language: English
- Edited by: Mary Rock, Lauren Tarpey, Michelle Wu

Publication details
- Former name: Stanford Environmental Law Annual
- History: 1978-present
- Publisher: Stanford University
- Frequency: Biannual

Standard abbreviations
- Bluebook: Stan. Envtl. L.J.
- ISO 4: Stanf. Environ. Law J.

Indexing
- ISSN: 0892-7138
- LCCN: 88648722
- OCLC no.: 15244703

Links
- Journal homepage

The Stanford Environmental Law Journal is a student-run law review published at Stanford Law School that covers natural resources law, environmental policy, law and economics, international environmental law, and other related disciplines.

== Overview ==
The journal was established in 1978 as the Stanford Environmental Law Annual to "provide a forum for student papers in developing areas of environmental law." After a three-year hiatus between 1983 and 1986, the journal resumed publication as the Stanford Environmental Law Journal. In the 2016 Washington and Lee University Law Journal Rankings, the journal was the second-highest rated environmental, natural resources, and land use law journal by impact factor. Articles in the journal have been cited by many state supreme courts and United States Courts of Appeals. Articles also appear in treatises written by American Law Reports and Westlaw.

== Abstracting and indexing ==
The journal is abstracted or indexed in EBSCO databases, HeinOnline, LexisNexis, Westlaw, and the University of Washington's Current Index to Legal Periodicals. Tables of contents are also available through Infotrieve and Ingenta, and the journal posts some past issues on its website.

== See also ==
- List of law journals
- List of environmental law journals
