= Texas Tech Administrative Law Journal =

- Discipline: Texas administrative law
- Language: English

Standard abbreviations
- Bluebook: Tex. Tech Admin. L.J.
- ISO 4: Tex. Tech Adm. Law J.

Links
- Journal homepage

Texas Tech Administrative Law Journal logo

The Texas Tech Administrative Law Journal was a student-run law review that discussed developments and issues in Texas administrative law. It was established in 2000 and was sponsored by the Administrative and Public Law Section of the State Bar of Texas. Its staff consisted of second- and third-year law students from the Texas Tech University School of Law.

The journal compiled articles in two annual books. Prior publications may be accessed via Westlaw, LexisNexis, and HeinOnline.

== Selection ==
The journal selected new members based upon their performance in a write-on competition open to first-year students. The Journal would then choose twenty individuals for membership.

== History ==
The journal was founded in 2000 and was the law school's second-oldest journal. The journal ceased publication after the 2018-2019 school year.
