= Harvard Environmental Law Review =

- Discipline: Environmental law
- Language: English
- Edited by: Cameron Dehmlow Dunne; Kirsten Flinn

Publication details
- History: 1976–present
- Publisher: Harvard Law School
- Frequency: Biannually

Standard abbreviations
- Bluebook: Harv. Envtl. L. Rev.
- ISO 4: Harv. Environ. Law Rev.

Indexing
- ISSN: 0147-8257
- LCCN: 77641876
- OCLC no.: 03231039

Links
- Journal homepage

The Harvard Environmental Law Review is a student-run law review published at Harvard Law School. The journal publishes articles, notes, and comments on subjects relating to environmental law, land-use law, and the regulation of natural resources.

== History and overview ==
The Harvard Environmental Law Review was founded in 1976 by Harvard Law School students Deborah Williams, James McDaniel, and Alan Gabbay; at the time, it was the school's fifth law journal. In a preface to the inaugural issue, former Harvard Law School dean Albert Sacks wrote that one of the journal's goals was to "raise questions" about whether environmental progress "conforms to an intelligent and coherent set of goals." The founding editors explained that the goal of the inaugural issue was to cover recent developments in environmental law and policy. However, in its early years, the journal shifted its focus toward a wider range of topics because "it was too ambitious to ask students to research and write a comprehensive overview of recent developments every year."

== Impact ==
In 2016, Washington and Lee University's Law Journal Rankings placed the journal as the top-ranked environmental, natural resources, and land use law journal according to combined score, impact factor, and journal citations. In his 1998 assessment of environmental law journals, Gregory Scott Crespi described the Harvard Environmental Law Review as a "leading journal" in its field. The journal has been cited in legal treatises, including American Jurisprudence, American Law Reports, and the Restatement (Third) of Property.

== Abstracting and indexing ==
The journal is abstracted or indexed in EBSCO databases, HeinOnline, LexisNexis, Westlaw, Scopus, and the University of Washington's Current Index to Legal Periodicals. Tables of contents are also available through Infotrieve and Ingenta, and the journal posts past issues on its website.

== See also ==
- List of law journals
- List of environmental law journals
