= Nanotechnology Law & Business =

- Discipline: Nanotechnology, technology law
- Language: English
- Edited by: Don Featherstone, Douglas Jamison

Publication details
- History: 2004-present
- Frequency: Quarterly

Standard abbreviations
- ISO 4: Nanotechnol. Law Bus.

Indexing
- ISSN: 1546-203X (print); 1546-2080 (web)
- LCCN: 2003212817
- OCLC no.: 723984517

Links
- Journal homepage

Nanotechnology Law & Business is a quarterly peer-reviewed law journal covering all legal, business, and policy aspects of nanotechnology. It was established in 2004 and the editors-in-chief are Don Featherstone (Sterne, Kessler, Goldstein & Fox) and Douglas Jamison (Harris & Harris Group).

== Abstracting and indexing ==
The journal is abstracted and indexed in Scopus.
