= Center on Race, Poverty and the Environment =

Nonprofit organization in California, US

Center on Race, Poverty & the Environment

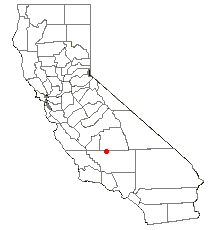
- CRPE's main office located in Delano, California
- Nickname: CRPE
- Formation: 1989; 37 years ago
- Founders: Luke Cole and Ralph Abascal
- Headquarters: Delano, California, United States
- Origins: California Rural Legal Assistance

The Center on Race, Poverty & the Environment (CRPE) is a California-based nonprofit organization founded in 1989 that provides legal support to grassroots groups in environmental justice communities. It focuses on addressing environmental issues affecting low-income communities and communities of color.

CRPE's stated mission is "to achieve environmental justice and healthy, sustainable communities through collective action and the law." The organization provides organizational, technical, and legal assistance to underserved communities facing environmental challenges. It currently maintains one office in Delano, California. Although much of its work focuses on California, it also supports work elsewhere.

== History ==
Luke Cole and Ralph Abascal began CRPE as a program within California Rural Legal Assistance and then founded it as a separate organization in 1989. The organization works with communities affected by environmental problems. CRPE participates in advocacy campaigns and legal cases in underrepresented, low-income communities. The organization provides support to address environmental and health challenges.

CRPE operates with the involvement of environmental justice attorneys. Co-founder Luke Cole provided legal and technical assistance to attorneys and community groups addressing environmental issues nationwide and was the Executive Director of the CRPE until he died in 2009. He was recognized by Berkeley’s Ecology Law Quarterly with the Environmental Leadership Award in 1997. Ralph Santiago Abascal, a graduate of UC Law SF, co-founded CRPE alongside Luke Cole. Abascal contributed by advising other attorneys and participating in over 200 court and administrative cases related to environmental justice issues affecting marginalized communities. Caroline Farrell became the Executive Director, based in the Delano office, after Cole's death.

== Notable cases ==
The Center on Race, Poverty, and the Environment has participated in legal cases addressing environmental issues in impacted communities, including:

=== El Pueblo Para El Aire y Agua Limpio v. County of Kings ===
The proposed expansion of the Chemical Waste Management hazardous waste landfill in Kettleman City, California, drew opposition from local advocacy groups, such as the Center on Race, Poverty & the Environment (CRPE) and El Pueblo Para El Aire y Agua Limpio, due to concerns about potential environmental and health impacts on the surrounding community. Ruled on in 1991.

=== Angelita C. et al. v. California Department of Pesticide Regulation ===
Angelita C. et al. v. California Department of Pesticide Regulation was an administrative complaint filed with the EPA alleging that the California Department of Pesticide Regulation failed to adequately protect Latino schoolchildren from pesticide exposure. Filed in 1999, ruled in 2011.

=== Romo v. Brown ===
This case addressed concerns about the potential impact of fracking near schools and residential areas, particularly in Latino communities in California’s Central Valley. Filed in 2015.

=== Central Valley Air Quality Coalition v. San Joaquin Valley Unified Air Pollution Control District ===
CRPE and other organizations filed a lawsuit against the district, claiming it allowed industrial sources to increase pollution levels in the San Joaquin Valley. Filed in 2023.

== Publications by CRPE staff ==
- Abascal, Ralph Abascal and Luke Cole. (1995). "The Struggle for Environmental Justice: Legal Services Advocates Tackle Environmental Poverty Law." Clearinghouse Review (29):459.
- Cole, Luke W. (1994). "The Struggle of Kettleman City: Lessons for the Movement." Maryland Journal of Contemporary Legal Issues, vol. 5, no. 1, pp. 67–80
- Cole, Luke W. and Sheila Foster. (2001). From the Ground Up: Environmental Racism and the Rise of the Environmental Justice Movement. New York: NYU Press.
- Farrell, Caroline. (2012). "A Just Transition: Lessons from the Environmental Justice Movement." Duke Forum for Law and Social Change, 4, pp. 45–64.
- Macey, Gregg, Caroline Farrell, Kayla Anderson, et al. (2024). "Pesticide Use and Civil Rights in Central California: Slow Violence and the State." Environment Science and Policy for Sustainable Development, 66(6): 6-24.
