= Texas Review of Entertainment & Sports Law =

- Discipline: Law
- Language: English
- Edited by: Kersten Kober

Publication details
- History: 2000–present
- Publisher: University of Texas School of Law
- Frequency: Biannual

Standard abbreviations
- Bluebook: Tex. Rev. Ent. & Sports L.
- ISO 4: Tex. Rev. Entertain. Sports Law

Indexing
- ISSN: 1533-1903
- LCCN: 2001214515
- OCLC no.: 45176548

Links
- Journal homepage

The Texas Review of Entertainment & Sports Law is a student-edited biannual law review at the University of Texas School of Law. It covers issues related to law that affects the entertainment and sports industries.

== History ==
The journal began in 1997, consisting only of student notes included as a supplement to The State Bar of Texas Entertainment and Sports Law Journal, published by the Entertainment and Sports Law Section of the State Bar of Texas. It became an independent journal in 2000.

== Symposia ==
On March 25, 2010, the journal held its first annual symposium. The subject was the expiring collective bargaining agreements in the National Basketball Association and the National Football League.
