= International Journal of Environmental Research =

- Language: English

Publication details
- History: 2007-Present
- Publisher: Springer Science+Business Media
- Frequency: Bimonthly
- Open access: Hybrid
- Impact factor: 3.5 (2024)

Standard abbreviations
- ISO 4: Int. J. Environ. Res.

Indexing
- ISSN: 1735-6865
- OCLC no.: 213371425

Links
- Journal homepage; Online archive

Established in 2007, the International Journal of Environmental Research is a bimonthly peer-reviewed scientific journal covering all aspects of scholarly research pertaining to the environment. Since 2017, the journal is published by Springer Science+Business Media with its editorial team based at the Graduate Faculty of Environment, University of Tehran, Iran. The Editor-in-Chief and Associate Editor are Dr. Hamidreza Jafari and Dr. Alireza Bazargan.

== Abstracting and indexing ==
The journal is abstracted and indexed in Science Citation Index Expanded, Scopus, Astrophysics Data System, EBSCO databases, INIS Atomindex, and The Zoological Record. According to the Journal Citation Reports, the journal has a 2021 impact factor of 3.229.
