= Virginia Environmental Law Journal =

- Discipline: Environmental Law
- Language: English

Publication details
- Former name(s): Virginia Journal of Natural Resources Law (1980–1989)
- History: 1980–present
- Publisher: University of Virginia School of Law (United States)
- Frequency: Triannually
- Impact factor: 0.48

Standard abbreviations
- Bluebook: Va. Envtl. L.J.
- ISO 4: Va. Environ. Law J.

Indexing
- CODEN: VELJF8
- ISSN: 1045-5183
- LCCN: 90644818
- OCLC no.: 19769977

Links
- Journal homepage

The Virginia Environmental Law Journal is a law review edited by students at the University of Virginia School of Law. The journal covers research and discussion in the areas of environmental and natural resource law, on a broad array of topics from environmental justice to corporate liability. In June 2020, the Journal was the seventh highest ranked environmental law journal in the United States.

The first volume of the Journal was published in 1980 as the Virginia Journal of Natural Resources Law. It is entirely student-run. The Journal is closely tied to the law school's program in environmental and land use law, and it provides the law school community with a forum for discussion of current environmental issues through its publication of legal scholarship related to the topic.

The journal publishes the works of leading scholars, practitioners, and government officials, as well as exceptional student notes.

== Annual symposia ==
Through its annual symposia, the Journal encourages dialogue about environmental law and policy among students, professors, and the local Charlottesville community.

== See also ==
- List of environmental law journals
