= University of San Diego School of Law =

Private law school in San Diego, California

Coordinates: 32°46′19″N 117°11′16″W

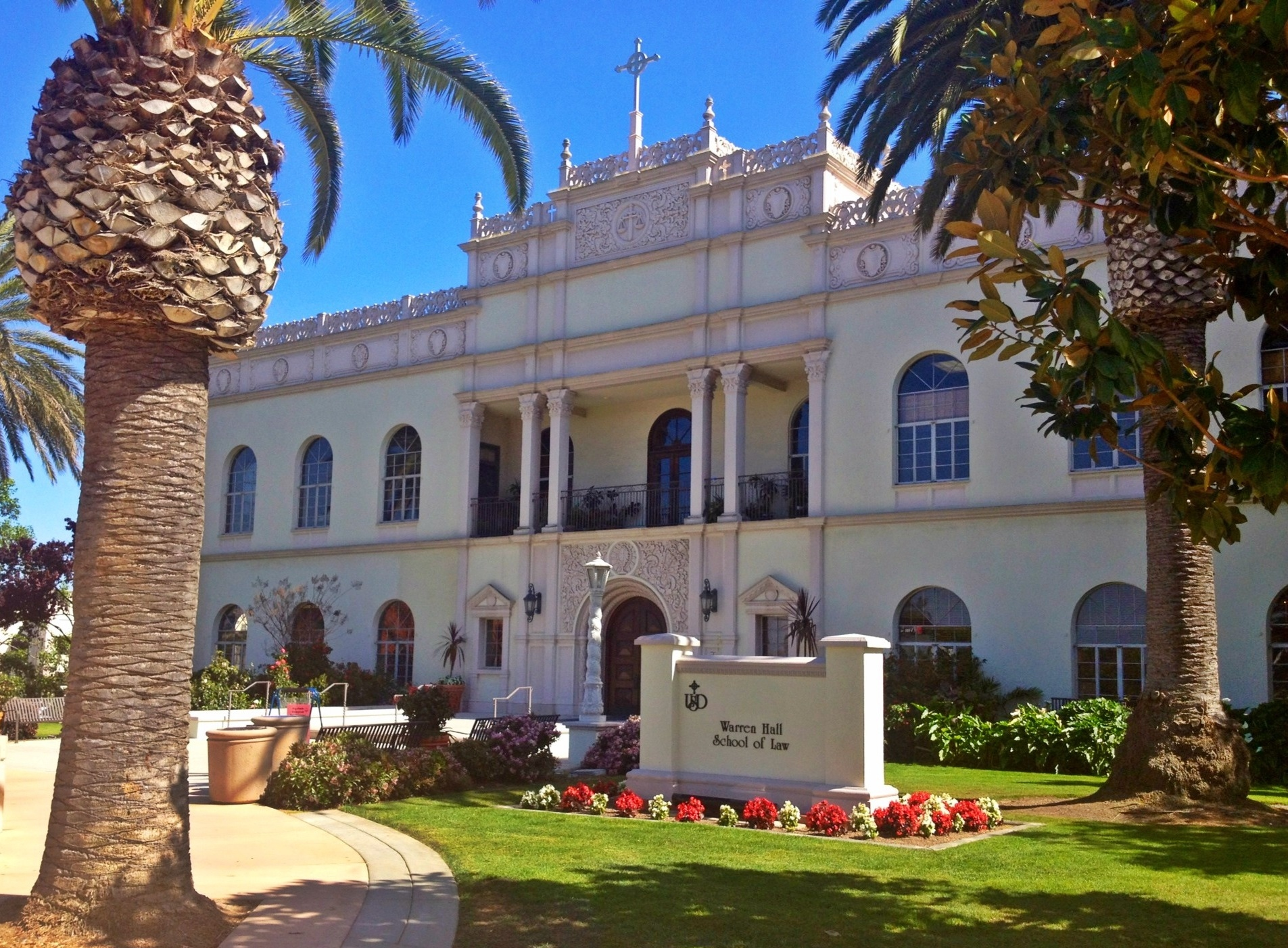
- Warren Hall
- Parent school: University of San Diego
- Established: 1954
- School type: Private law school
- Dean: Robert Schapiro
- Location: San Diego, California, United States
- Enrollment: 1,007 (Full- and part-time)
- Faculty: 94 (Full- and part-time)
- USNWR ranking: 54th (2026)
- Bar pass rate: 86% (July 2025 1st time takers)
- Website: sandiego.edu/law/
- ABA profile: Standard 509 Report

The University of San Diego School of Law (USD Law) is the law school of the University of San Diego, a private Roman Catholic research university in San Diego, California. Founded in 1954, the law school has held ABA approval since 1961. It joined the Association of American Law Schools (AALS) in 1966.

== Academics ==
USD Law offers Juris Doctor (J.D.) degrees in either a three-year full-time or a four-year part-time program. Advanced law degree programs offered include Master of Laws (LL.M.) degrees in Taxation, International Law, Criminal Law, Intellectual Property Law, Business and Corporate Law, Environmental and Energy Law, Employment and Labor law, and in Comparative Law for graduates of international law schools. Concurrent degree programs are offered to achieve a J.D. degree with either a Masters in Business Administration, International Master of Business Administration, or Master of Arts in International Relations.

=== Rankings ===
USD Law placed 64th among the nation's "Top 150" law schools in 2022 according to the U.S. News & World Report. It previously was ranked 71st in the 2016 rankings, and 86th in the 2020 rankings. In April 2010, USD was ranked 6th in the nation in tax law and first in the Western United States among law schools with graduate tax programs. In January 2011, USD Law was given a "B+" in the "Best Public Interest Law Schools" listing by The National Jurist: The Magazine for Law Students.

The school is a member of the Order of the Coif, a national law school honorary society.

=== Dean ===
The dean of the law school is Robert Schapiro. Prior to his tenure as dean, Robert A. Schapiro was the Dean of Emory University School of Law. Dean Schapiro is Asa Griggs Candler Professor of Law and Co-Director of Emory School of Law’s Center on Federalism and Intersystemic Governance. From 2012 to 2017 he served as Dean of Emory University School of Law. Schapiro, an internationally recognized scholar of federalism, is the author of Polyphonic Federalism: Toward the Protection of Fundamental Rights (University of Chicago Press, 2009). A graduate of Yale Law School, he served as editor-in-chief of the Yale Law Journal. He clerked for Judge Pierre N. Leval of the U.S. District Court for the Southern District of New York and for Justice John Paul Stevens of the U.S. Supreme Court.

=== Faculty ===
In a 2003–2004 survey based exclusively on academic criteria, Brian Leiter of the University of Chicago Law School ranked USD Law 22nd in the nation for faculty scholarly reputation. Leiter rated USD Law as "Also Strong" in Criminal Law & Procedure, Jurisprudence/Legal Philosophy, Law & Religion, and Legal Ethics.

Six faculty members are members of the American Law Institute, a legal research organization.

==== Notable guest professors ====
On numerous occasions, Supreme Court Justice Antonin Scalia judged the final round of intramural moot court competitions on campus prior to his death in 2016. Along with this, he was a guest lecturer of Constitutional Law classes as well as classes on Oral Advocacy.

==== Media appearances ====
Faculty member Junichi P. Semitsu appeared on Who Wants to Be a Millionaire and faculty member Frank Partnoy appeared on an episode of The Daily Show discussing his book The Match King: Ivar Kreuger, The Financial Genius Behind a Century of Wall Street Scandals.

=== Students ===
In 2023, the 75th percentile of Law School Admission Test (LSAT) scores was 163 and the 25th percentile of LSAT scores was 157 for admitted full-time students.

==== Bar passage rates ====
79% of USD Law graduates who took the California Bar in July 2023 for the first time, passed, compared to 64.8% for all first time applicants who completed the July 2018 California Bar Examination.

== Advocacy programs ==
=== Appellate Moot Court ===
The law school's Appellate Moot Court team is composed of two boards, the Executive Board and the Associate Board. The Appellate Moot Court Board hosts two intramural competitions each year, the Alumni Torts Moot Court Tournament and the Constitutional law focused Paul A. McLennon Sr., Honors Moot Court Competition. Both competitions are open to all students after completion of their first year. Additionally, the Board hosts the National Criminal Procedure Competition each fall open to national moot court teams from law schools across the country.

=== National Trial Team (Mock Trial) ===
USD Law's National Trial Team trains students for regional and national trial competitions, competing in five major tournaments each year.

=== Transactional Law Team (TLT) ===
The Transactional Law Team competes in the National Transactional Law Meet.

=== Vis International Commercial Arbitration Moot (VICAM) ===
USD Law's Vis International Commercial Arbitration Moot (VICAM) team competes in the area of international commercial law and arbitration, also known as alternative dispute resolution. Members of VICAM compete in the Willem C. Vis Moot in Vienna, Austria and the Vis East in Hong Kong.

USD VICAM hosts the Michael Thorsnes International Commercial Arbitration Competition each year. The competition serves as preparation for the Willem C. Vis Moot. It is an international competition, and in 2017 twenty-two teams from ten schools participated, including schools from Japan and Russia.

== Student publications ==
- San Diego Law Review
- San Diego International Law Journal
- San Diego Journal of Climate and Energy Law

== Employment ==
Of the 245 students who graduated USD Law in 2022, 235 (95.9%) were employed in some capacity 9 months after graduation. According to the University of San Diego's official 2018 ABA-required disclosures, 67% of the Class of 2018 obtained full-time, long-term, JD required employment nine months after graduation. The University of San Diego's Law School Transparency under-employment score is 24.6%, indicating the percentage of the Class of 2018 unemployed, pursuing an additional degree, or working in a non-professional, short-term, or part-time job nine months after graduation.

== Costs ==
The total cost of attendance (indicating the cost of tuition, fees, and living expenses) at the University of San Diego School of Law for the 2017-2018 academic year is $74,086. The Law School Transparency estimated debt-financed cost of attendance for three years is $270,135.

== Notable alumni ==
- Thomas J. Barrack Jr., 1971, real estate investor and CEO Colony Capital
- Shelley Berkley, 1976, Member U.S. House of Representatives
- Mark Brnovich, 1991, Arizona Attorney General
- Larry Alan Burns, 1979, federal judge specially appointed for a spree murder trial for the 2011 Tucson shooting in Arizona.
- Dave Camp, 1978, Member U.S. House of Representatives, Chairman of the Ways and Means Committee
- Theo Epstein, 2000, formerly the youngest general manager in the history of MLB; president of baseball operations for the Chicago Cubs
- Jonathan Fahey, former U.S. Immigration and Customs Enforcement director
- Joseph Ghougassian, 1980, diplomat
- Jan Goldsmith, 1976, City Attorney of San Diego and former California State Assemblyman and judge
- Nancy Halliday, United States Ambassador to Slovenia
- Robert Kardashian, 1967, lawyer for O. J. Simpson and father of reality show personalities Courtney, Kim, Khloé, and Robert Jr.
- Judith N. Keep, 1970, Chief District Judge of the Southern District from 1991 to 1998
- James E. McPherson, 1981, Judge Advocate General of the Navy and Under Secretary of the Army
- Ron Mix, Football Hall of Fame offensive tackle
- Thomas P. O’Brien, 1993, United States Attorney for the Central District of California
- Rod Pacheco, 1983, former California Assembly Member and District Attorney of Riverside County
- Ron D. Parraguirre, 1985, Chief Justice for the Supreme Court of Nevada
- Julie Roland, Naval officer, lawyer, and columnist
- Wade Sanders, Deputy Assistant United States Secretary of the Navy for Reserve Affairs and convicted sex offender
- Lynn Schenk, 1970, former Member U.S. House of Representatives
- Michael J. Streit, 1975, Associate Justice of the Iowa Supreme Court
- Danny Tarkanian, Nevada politician, former college basketball player, and son of college basketball coach Jerry Tarkanian
- Frances Townsend, 1984, former Homeland Security Advisor
- Larry Williams, American football player
