= New England Law Review =

- Discipline: Law
- Language: English
- Edited by: Kyle Sutton

Publication details
- Former name: Portia Law Journal
- History: 1965 to present
- Publisher: New England Law Boston (United States)
- Frequency: quarterly

Standard abbreviations
- Bluebook: New Eng. L. Rev.
- ISO 4: N. Engl. Law Rev.

Indexing
- ISSN: 0028-4823
- OCLC no.: 818988564

Links
- Journal homepage

The New England Law Review is a law review that was established in 1965 as the Portia Law Journal. It obtained its current name when Portia Law School changed its name to New England School of Law in 1969. It is run by students and currently publishes four issues annually. The review also conducts Fall and Spring symposiums.

== The Forum ==
The New England Law Review Forum is a semi-standalone online publication. The Forum supplements the printed journal and features timely articles that are especially pertinent to legal discourse. The Forum also regularly publishes professor blogs and a podcast. In addition the articles that are only available through the Forum, the website also publishes the journal's printed volumes. The Forum has since replaced the previous online extension On Remand.

== On Remand ==
On Remand was developed and launched by the members of the Volume 45 editorial board. It is an online extension of the review's print content: it features original works, unique legal commentaries, and responses to articles printed in the review.

== Lex Per Sonus ==
Lex Per Sonus was developed as the new version of the New England Law Review's podcast by Volume 59 Executive Online Editor Damien Wilson and Podcast Editor Agripino Kennedy. The podcast featured six episodes during the Volume 59 season.

== Membership ==
The New England Law Review consists of approximately sixty second- and third-year law students at the New England School of Law. To become a member of the review, students completing their first-year in the top fifty percent of their class may participate in a spring write-on competition. Based on performance in this competition, approximately thirty students are invited to join the review, beginning in the Fall semester of their second year.
