= Employee Relations Law Journal =

- Discipline: Labour law
- Language: English
- Edited by: Steven A. Meyerowitz

Publication details
- Publisher: Wolters Kluwer
- Frequency: Quarterly

Standard abbreviations
- ISO 4: Empl. Relat. Law J.
- NLM: Employee Relat Law J

Indexing
- CODEN: ERLJDC
- ISSN: 0098-8898
- LCCN: 75646014
- OCLC no.: 02242810

Links
- Journal homepage

The Employee Relations Law Journal is a legal journal which publishes articles in the field of labor and employment law. The journal covers employment law issues such as the Americans with Disabilities Act, family medical leave, sexual harassment, terminations, age discrimination, alternative dispute resolution, National Labor Relations Board decisions, and trends in employment law. The journal also includes regular columnists. These explore topics such as new employment and labor relations laws, regulations, court cases, developments in employee benefits administration, on-the-job safety and health issues, and labor-management relations. The journal is published quarterly by Wolters Kluwer.
