= J. Alberto Aragon-Correa =

Business data scientist and Professor of Management

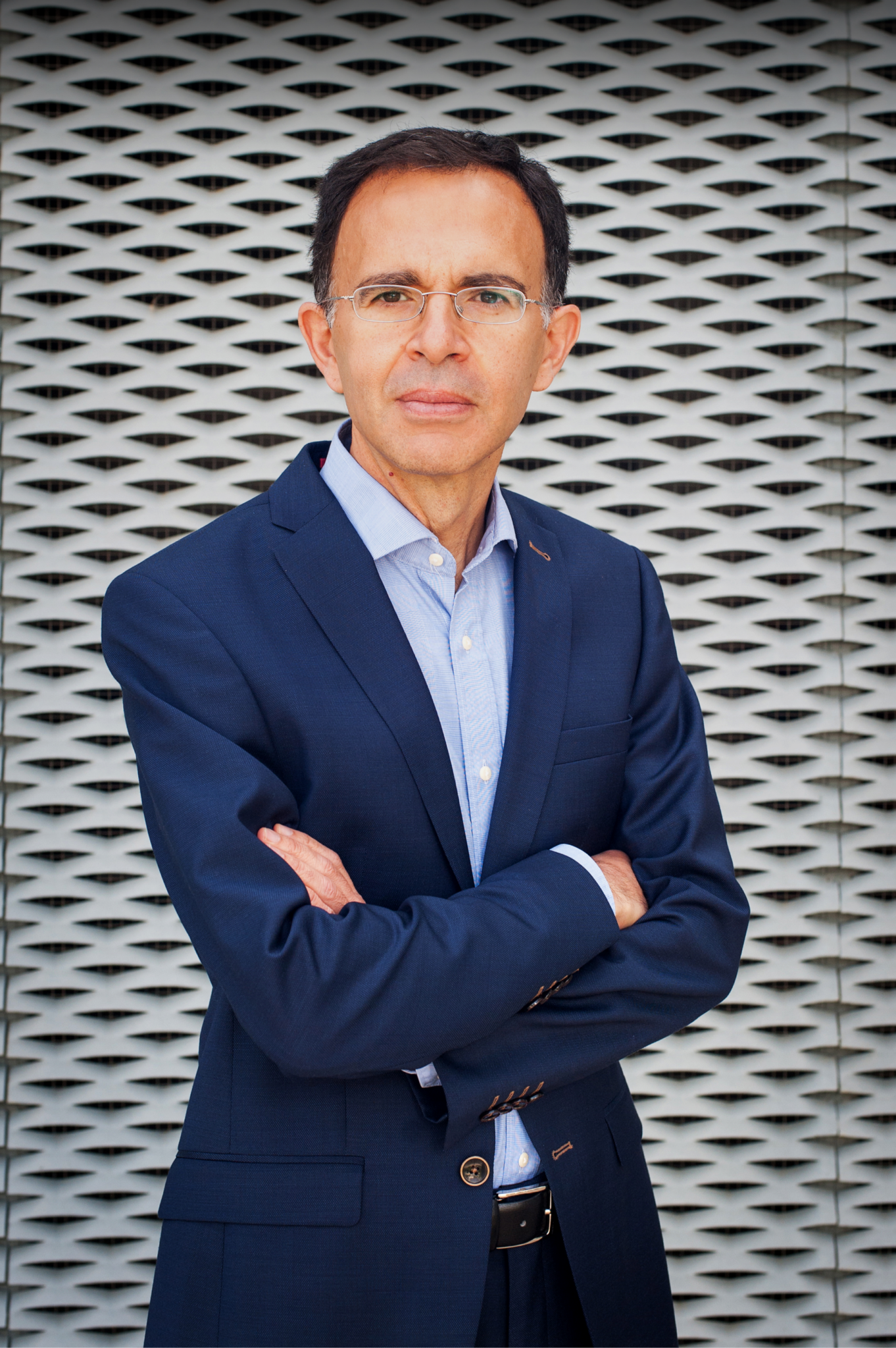
- Born: 1970 (age 55–56); Spain
- Education: PhD economics and business
- Occupations: Business data scientist, director of the talent incubator, and professor of management
- Employer: University of Granada
- Known for: Business strategy, sustainability, corporate innovation, internationalization, and governance
- Awards: Academy of Management «ONE Distinguished Scholar Award», «Carolyn Dexter Award» finalist, and «ONE Services Award», among others.

J. Alberto Aragon-Correa (also known as Alberto Aragon and Juan Alberto Aragón Correa) is a business data scientist and the current Professor of Management and Director of the Talent Incubator at the University of Granada. Aragon-Correa serves as the founding director of three endowed chairs dedicated to providing complimentary mentoring and resources to university students, focusing on the areas of leadership and sustainability.

Previously Aragon-Correa was an Honorary Professor of Management and Professor of International Business at the University of Surrey (United Kingdom). He was also a guest visiting scholar at University of California, Los Angeles (USA), University of California, Berkeley (USA), and ETH Zurich (Switzerland).

== Awards and distinctions ==
Aragon-Correa was awarded the Academy of Management «ONE Distinguished Scholar Award», a distinction designed to recognize scholars who have assumed leadership roles within the field.

His research has gained recognition, featuring in the "List of Top Two Percent Scientists in the World" published by Prof. Ioannidis (Stanford University) and colleagues. Additionally, Aragon-Correa was honored with the Academy of Management “ONE Services Award” for his leadership as Chair of the Organizations and Natural Environment Division within the Academy of Management. Furthermore, he has achieved finalist status twice for the Carolyn Dexter Award, which acknowledges outstanding papers that contribute to the internationalization of management research.

Aragon-Correa's work has also garnered attention from national and international media. One of his works achieved a gross audience of 89.7 million people, securing coverage in 6,310 media outlets and generating an economic impact for his university exceeding 1.8 million euros in advertising terms.

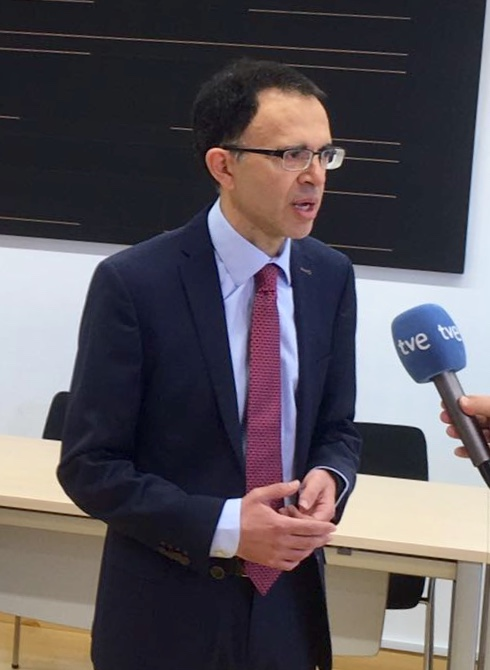
J. Alberto Aragon-Correa explains his work in RTVE -the public TV station in Spain-

== Publications ==
Aragon-Correa's research has been published in different journals in the fields of business and management. As of December 2023, his works have received 13744 citations according to Google Scholar. Some of his most-cited publications include:

- Aragón-Correa, J.A. Sharma, S. (2003): A contingent resource-based view of proactive corporate environmental strategy], Academy of Management Review, vol. 28, 1, pp. 71–88 (https://doi.org/10.5465/amr.2003.8925233).
- Aragón-Correa, J.A. (1998): Strategic proactivity and firm approach to the natural environment], Academy of Management Journal, vol. 41, 5, pp. 556–567 (https://doi.org/10.5465/256942).
- Aragón-Correa, J.A., García-Morales, V.J., Cordón-Pozo, E. (2007): Leadership and organizational learning's role on innovation and performance: Lessons from Spain, Industrial Marketing Management, vol. 36, 3, pp. 349–359 (https://doi.org/10.1016/j.indmarman.2005.09.006).
- Aragón-Correa, J.A., Hurtado-Torres, N.E., Sharma, S., García-Morales, V.J. (2008): Environmental strategy and performance in small firms: A resource-based perspective], Journal of Environmental Management, vol. 86, 1, pp. 88–103 (https://doi.org/10.1016/j.jenvman.2006.11.022).
- Aragón-Correa, J. A., Marcus, A., & Hurtado-Torres, N. (2016). The natural environmental strategies of international firms: Controversies and new evidence on performance and disclosure. Academy of Management Perspectives, 30 (1), 24–39. (https://doi.org/10.5465/amp.2014.0043).
- Aragon-Correa, J.A., Marcus, A., Rivera, J., Kenworthy, A. (2017): Sustainability management teaching resources and the challenge of balancing planet, people, and profits, Academy of Management Learning & Education, 16 (3), 469–483 (https://doi.org/10.5465/amle.2017.0180).
- Leyva-de la Hiz, D. I., Ferron-Vilchez, V., & Aragon-Correa, J. A. (2019). Do firms’ slack resources influence the relationship between focused environmental innovations and financial performance? More is not always better. Journal of Business Ethics, 159 (4), 1215–1227 (https://doi.org/10.1007/s10551-017-3772-3).
- Aragon-Correa, J.A., Marcus, A., & Vogel, D. (2020). The institutional challenges of regulation: The heterogeneous effects of mandatory and self-regulatory pressures on firm's environmental strategies. Academy of Management Annals, 14 (1), 339–365 (https://doi.org/10.5465/annals.2018.0014).
- Aguilera, R., Aragon-Correa, J.A., Marano, V. (2021): The corporate governance of environmental sustainability. Journal of Management, 47 (6), 1468–1497 (https://doi.org/10.1177/0149206321991212).
- Ellimäki, P., Aguilera, R. V., Hurtado-Torres, N. E., & Aragón-Correa, J. A. (2023). The link between foreign institutional owners and multinational enterprises’ environmental outcomes. Journal of International Business Studies, 1–18 (https://doi.org/10.1057/s41267-022-00580-0).

== Research experience ==
Aragon-Correa's research examines firms’ business strategies, especially those related to the connections between innovation, governance, and sustainability in multinational firms. Aragon-Correa's two most cited papers have been published in the Academy of Management Review and the Academy of Management Journal respectively. Three of his most recent and popular works have been published in the Journal of Management, Academy of Management Review, and the Journal of International Business Studies. Most of his publications have used samples of business data and multivariable analytic methodologies. The previous section of this article includes a detailed list of his works.

== Additional experience ==
Aragon-Correa has played a leadership role in various academic international initiatives. Notably, he was the founding President of the Group of Research on Organizations and the Natural Environment (GRONEN), an international network of scholars dedicated to fostering "relevant research with the highest levels of rigor". Additionally, he served as a member of the steering committee of the Organizations and Natural Environment's (ONE) Division within the Academy of Management for five years, eventually assuming the role of chair for this division.

He currently holds the position of Editor for the Cambridge University Press book series titled ″Organizations and the Natural Environment″ (in collaboration with Professor Jorge Rivera). Aragon-Correa also serves as a Consulting Editor for Organization & Environment, a journal focusing on sustainability and management published by SAGE Publishing. Previously, he held the position of Editor-in-Chief of Organization & Environment, in collaboration with Professor Mark Starik, from 2013 to 2016.
