= Center for Environmental Philosophy =

American non-profit organization

The Center for Environmental Philosophy is a non-profit organization that supports a range of scholarly activities that explore philosophical aspects of environmental problems. It publishes the scholarly journal Environmental Ethics. The center best known for this leading journal in the field of environmental philosophy and is widely regarded as establishing the field of environmental ethics and is considered to be the leading scholarly forum about environmental philosophy.

In addition to the publication of its journal, the Center promotes graduate education and postdoctoral research in environmental philosophy, and supports the development of international perspectives on global environmental problems. The Center for Environmental Philosophy is located at the University of North Texas in Denton, Texas.

The center was established in 1989 by Environmental Philosophy, Inc. as a center for its various activities in publishing, research, and education. The center moved to the University of North Texas in 1990 and was given the status of an affiliated organization in 1991.

== Books ==
The Center for Environmental Philosophy publishes books under the title "Environmental Ethics Books" to make these major works in the field of environmental ethics available in print, including the following titles:

- After Earth Day, by Max Oelschlaeger
- The Beauty of Environment: A General Model for Environmental Aesthetics, by Yrjo Sepanmaa
- Beyond Spaceship Earth: Environmental Ethics and the Solar System, edited by Eugene C. Hargrove
- Foundations of Environmental Ethics, by Eugene C. Hargrove
- Is It Too Late? A Theology of Ecology, by John B. Cobb, Jr.
- The Liberation of Life: From the Cell to the Community, by Charles Birch and John B. Cobb, Jr.

== See also ==
- List of environmental organizations
