= Lino Graglia =

American legal academic (1930–2022)

Lino Anthony Graglia (January 22, 1930 – January 30, 2022) was the A. W. Walker Centennial Chair in Law at the University of Texas specializing in antitrust litigation. He earned a BA from the City College of New York in 1952, and an LLB from Columbia University in 1954, before working in the Eisenhower administration's United States Department of Justice. He thereafter practiced law in Washington, D.C., and New York City before joining the University of Texas' law school in 1966.

As a legal academic, Graglia was very conservative. He was a critic of affirmative action and racial quotas, and a critic of some aspects of judicial review, believing that the courts are an illegitimate avenue for securing social change.

His wife, F. Carolyn Graglia, is an author who has written a book critical of feminism entitled Domestic Tranquility: A Brief Against Feminism.

Graglia died on January 30, 2022, in Austin, Texas.

== Failed nomination to the Fifth Circuit ==
In the mid-1980s, Graglia was considered by President Ronald Reagan for a newly created federal judgeship on the United States Court of Appeals for the Fifth Circuit, but he eventually was withdrawn in late spring 1986 due to controversy over articles Graglia had written about desegregation busing as well as remarks Graglia made which were alleged to be racially insensitive. The following year, Reagan nominated Jerry Edwin Smith to the seat to which Graglia had been nominated, and Smith was confirmed easily.

== Remarks ==
Graglia made a speech on UT campus in 1997 in which he said that "blacks and Mexican-Americans can't compete academically with whites." The speech was at a meeting of the Students for Equal Opportunity on the topic of the Hopwood v. Texas case, which ended affirmative action for UT Law applicants who were members of a designated "minority" group (in 2003 the Supreme Court abrogated Hopwood in Grutter v. Bollinger). The comment was widely reported and generated discussions across the country.

In an article titled The Affirmative Action Fraud, published in 1999 in the Journal of Urban and Contemporary Law, Graglia cited The Bell Curve, a book by professor Richard J. Herrnstein and American Enterprise Institute political scientist Charles Murray, to assert the following:

Blacks are not in fact 'underrepresented,' but rather 'overrepresented'—that is, their numbers are disproportionately high—in institutions of higher education once IQ scores are taken into account.

In 2009 Graglia was a speaker at a conference organized by white separatist Michael H. Hart on the claimed need to defend "America's Judeo-Christian heritage and European identity."

In 2012, he suggested that blacks and Hispanics are falling behind in education because they are increasingly raised in single-parent families.

== Writings ==
- Disaster by Decree: The Supreme Court's Decision on Race and the Schools, Cornell University Press, Ithaca, N.Y., 1976, ISBN 0-8014-0980-2
- The Supreme Court's Busing Decisions: A Study in Government by the Judiciary, International Institute for Economic Research, Los Angeles, 1978, OCLC 4685651
- Courting Disaster: The Supreme Court and the Demise of Popular Government, Institute of United States Studies, University of London, London, 1997, ISBN 9780718714468
