= National Black Law Students Association =

- Logo of the National Black Law Students Association
- Abbreviation: NBLSA
- Formation: 1968; 58 years ago
- Founder: Algernon Johnson Cooper
- Founded at: New York University Law School
- Type: Organization
- Purpose: To articulate and promote the needs and goals of black law students and effectuate change in the legal community
- Headquarters: Washington, D.C.
- Region served: United States
- Members: 6000
- Affiliations: National Bar Association
- Website: Official website

The National Black Law Students Association (NBLSA), founded in 1968, is a student organization in the United States formed to articulate and promote the needs and goals of black law students and effectuates change in the legal community. As the largest law student organization in the country with over 6,000 members, NBLSA includes chapters or affiliates in six countries including the Bahamas, Nigeria, and South Africa. NBLSA encourages the development of talented, social conscious lawyers of tomorrow. NBLSA help start the Black Law Students Association of Canada (BLSAC), the National Latino/Latina Student Association (NLLSA), National Association of Law Students with Disabilities (NALSD), and the National Asian Pacific American Law Student Association (NAPALSA). The headquarters of NBLSA is located in Washington, D.C. Organized into six regions (Northeast, Mid-Atlantic, Southern, Mid-West, Rocky Mountain and Western Region) the organization has over 200 chapters and is present in all but a few of the nation's accredited law schools, as well as unaccredited law schools. Each year, the organization holds an annual convention to engage in legal activism and while preparing new generations of black lawyers to "effectuate change." Additionally, the Frederick Douglass Moot Court and Thurgood Marshall Mock Trial Competitions are held during its Annual Convention.

In 1968, Algernon Johnson Cooper, former mayor of Prichard, Alabama, founded the first Black American Law Students Association at the New York University Law School. In 1983, BALSA revised its name and the word "American" was deleted to encompass all blacks, including those not of American nationality. Later, the word "National" was added to reflect the organization's national expansion, which now includes representation in the law schools of forty-eight states and Puerto Rico.

The association has ties with the National Bar Association, the Council on Legal Education Opportunity, The National Black Alliance, and the National Black Leadership Roundtable.

At the fortieth anniversary convention of the NBLSA in Detroit Cooper, speaking on the origins of the organization, said:

We organized at NYU during the halcyon days of the late '60s, in the midst of riots, and our mission was contemplated, debated, discussed, agreed upon, refined and re-refined as only law students can do. But finally, we decided that our mission was to articulate and promote professional needs and goals of African American law students ...to initiate a change within the legal system that would make it more responsive to the needs of the African American community.
