= Journal of Interpretation Research =

- Discipline: Heritage interpretation, Environmental education
- Language: English
- Edited by: Robert B. Powell and Marc J. Stern

Publication details
- History: 1996—present
- Publisher: National Association for Interpretation (United States)
- Frequency: Biannually
- Open access: Delayed, after 2 years

Standard abbreviations
- ISO 4: J. Interpret. Res.

Indexing
- ISSN: 1092-5872
- LCCN: 97657672
- OCLC no.: 276948475

Links
- Journal homepage; Online archive

The Journal of Interpretation Research is a biannual peer-reviewed academic journal covering research and discourse in the field of environmental interpretation, heritage interpretation, and environmental education. It is published by the National Association for Interpretation. The editors-in-chief are Robert B. Powell (Clemson University, Clemson, SC, United States) and Marc J. Stern (Virginia Tech, Blacksburg, VA, United States.
