= Ecology Law Quarterly =

- Discipline: Environmental law
- Language: English

Publication details
- History: 1971-present
- Publisher: UC Berkeley School of Law (United States)
- Frequency: Quarterly
- Open access: Yes

Standard abbreviations
- Bluebook: Ecology L.Q.
- ISO 4: Ecol. Law Q.

Indexing
- ISSN: 0046-1121
- LCCN: 74644091
- OCLC no.: 473117706

Links
- Journal homepage; Online archive

Ecology Law Quarterly is an environmental law review published quarterly by students at the UC Berkeley School of Law. The journal also produces Ecology Law Currents, an "online companion journal designed to publish pieces on a more frequent basis than the print journal."

== Recognition ==
Ecology Law Quarterly received the United Nations Environment Programme's "Global 500 Roll of Honour" Award in 1990, the only academic journal among the recipients.

In a 1998 survey of experts, Ecology Law Quarterly was ranked as the most influential environmental law review in the United States.

In Washington & Lee School of Law's 2020 combined score rankings of Environmental and Land Use Law journals, Ecology Law Quarterly ranked 3rd overall.

Ecology Law Quarterly articles have been cited by various courts, including the U.S. Supreme Court, U.S. Courts of Appeal, and U.S. District Courts. Ecology Law Quarterly received the highest number of case citations of any environmental law journal in 2015, 2016, and 2017.

== See also ==
- List of environmental law journals
