= Ingenta =

UK-based provider of content services

- Company type: Public
- Traded as: AIM: ING
- Industry: Publishing (Technology)
- Founded: 1998
- Headquarters: Oxford, England
- Key people: G. Scott Winner, Chief Executive Officer; Jon Sheffield, Chief Financial Officer
- Products: Ingenta Commercial, Ingenta Advertising, Ingenta Content, Ingenta Connect, VISTA and Publishers Communication Group (PCG)
- Subsidiaries: Publishers Communication Group (PCG)
- Website: www.ingenta.com

Ingenta is a provider of content services for the publishing industry, based in Oxford in the United Kingdom. Customers include both academic and trade publishers as well as information providers. Ingenta plc is listed on the Alternative Investment Market (AIM) of the London Stock Exchange under the ticker symbol LSE: ING.

The company provides software systems and services for the publishing industry, including systems that support the infrastructure of a publisher (including production, distribution, royalties and editorial) and the digital delivery of publishers' products. Their Publishers Communication Group division provides sales and marketing consultancy services for publishers.

Ingenta operates primarily from the UK (Oxford) and the USA (New Brunswick, New Jersey).

== History ==
Ingenta was established in 1998. In 2001 Ingenta acquired Publishers Communication Group (founded in 1990) and in 2007 acquired VISTA (founded in 1977). From 2007 until 2016, the company was known as Publishing Technology.

In 2016, Ingenta purchased the advertising software company 5fifteen.

== See also ==
- List of academic databases and search engines
