= List of law journals =

This list of law journals includes notable academic periodicals on law. The law reviews are grouped by jurisdiction or country and then into subject areas.

== International ==
=== Public international law ===
- American Journal of International Law
- American Journal of Trial Advocacy
- Berkeley Journal of International Law
- Chicago Journal of International Law
- Connecticut Journal of International Law
- Cornell International Law Journal
- European Journal of International Law
- Florida Journal of International Law
- Global Jurist
- The George Washington International Law Review
- Harvard International Law Journal
- Indian Journal of International Law
- International Journal of Transitional Justice
- Journal of International Law and International Relations
- Melbourne Journal of International Law
- Minnesota Journal of International Law
- New York University Journal of International Law and Politics
- North Carolina Journal of International Law and Commercial Regulation
- Oxford University Commonwealth Law Journal
- San Diego International Law Journal
- Suffolk Transnational Law Review
- Texas International Law Journal
- Tulane Journal of International and Comparative Law
- Utrecht Journal of International and European Law
- Virginia Journal of International Law
- Washington International Law Journal
- The Yale Journal of International Law

== Africa ==
- African Human Rights Law Journal
- African Journal of Legal Studies
- Comparative and International Law Journal of Southern Africa
- South African Law Journal

== Australia ==
- Adelaide Law Review
- Alternative Law Journal
- Australian Guide to Legal Citation
- Australian Indigenous Law Review
- Australian Journal of Labour Law
- Australian Law Journal
- Company and Securities Law Journal
- Deakin Law Review
- Griffith Law Review
- Indigenous Law Bulletin
- James Cook University Law Review
- Macquarie Law Journal
- Melbourne University Law Review
- Monash University Law Review
- Sydney Law Review
- University of Queensland Law Journal
- University of Western Sydney Law Review
- UWA Law Review

== Canada ==
- Alberta Law Review
- Canadian Journal of Administrative Law and Practice
- Canadian Journal of Family Law
- Canadian Journal of Women and the Law
- Dalhousie Journal of Legal Studies
- Dalhousie Law Journal
- Independent Review Committee
- Journal of International Law and International Relations
- McGill Journal of Sustainable Development Law
- McGill Law Journal
- National Property Law Digests
- Osgoode Hall Law Journal
- Queen's Law Journal
- Revue générale de droit
- University of Toronto Faculty of Law Review
- University of Toronto Law Journal
- Western Journal of Legal Studies

== Chile ==
- Revista de Derecho

== Europe ==
- European Competition Law Review
- European Intellectual Property Review
- European Journal of International Law
- Oil, Gas and Energy Law
- Utrecht Journal of International and European Law

== Germany ==
- German Law Journal

== India ==
- Annual Survey of Indian Law
- Banaras Law Journal
- Indian Journal of Law and Technology
- National Law School of India Review
- Symbiosis Contemporary Law Journal

== Israel ==
- Haifa Law Review
- Israel Law Review
- Jerusalem Review of Legal Studies
- Theoretical Inquiries in Law

== Mexico ==
- Mexican Law Review

== New Zealand ==
- Auckland University Law Review
- Canterbury Law Review
- The Laws of New Zealand
- New Zealand Intellectual Property Journal
- Otago Law Review

== Philippines ==
- Philippine Law Journal

== United Kingdom ==
=== General ===
- Cambrian Law Review
- Cambridge Law Journal
- Edinburgh Law Review
- King's Law Journal
- Law Quarterly Review
- Medical Law Review
- Modern Law Review
- New Law Journal
- Oxford Journal of Legal Studies

=== Commercial law ===
- Corporate Rescue and Insolvency

=== Criminal law ===
- Criminal Law Review

=== Employment law ===
- Industrial Law Journal
- Regulation & Governance

=== Public law ===
- Public Law

== United States ==
- Annual Review of Law and Social Science
- Journal of Business & Securities Law

== Canon law ==
- Ecclesiastical Law Journal
- The Jurist

== See also ==
- List of international law journals
- List of intellectual property law journals
- List of social science journals
