= List of international law journals =

This list presents notable law reviews concerned with international law and related fields.

- American Journal of International Law
- Asian Journal of International Law
- Berkeley Journal of International Law
- Case Western Reserve Journal of International Law
- Chicago Journal of International Law
- Chinese Journal of International Law
- Columbia Journal of Transnational Law
- Cornell International Law Journal
- European Journal of International Law
- European Transport Law
- Florida Journal of International Law
- Fordham International Law Journal
- The George Washington International Law Review
- Georgetown Journal of International Law
- German Law Journal
- German Yearbook of International Law
- Goettingen Journal of International Law
- Harvard International Law Journal
- Hastings International and Comparative Law Review
- Houston Journal of International Law
- Indiana Journal of Global Legal Studies
- International Association of Labour Law Journals
- The International Lawyer
- Journal on European History of Law
- Melbourne Journal of International Law
- Minnesota Journal of International Law
- San Diego International Law Journal
- Stanford Journal of International Law
- Temple International and Comparative Law Journal
- Texas International Law Journal
- Trade, Law and Development
- Transnational Law & Contemporary Problems
- Tulane Journal of International and Comparative Law
- University of Pennsylvania Journal of International Law
- Utrecht Journal of International and European Law
- Vanderbilt Journal of Transnational Law
- Virginia Journal of International Law
- Washington International Law Journal
- Washington University Global Studies Law Review
- The Yale Journal of International Law

== See also ==
- List of law journals
- Law
