= Faculty of Law, Banaras Hindu University =

Coordinates: 25.269598°N 82.998198°E

- Motto: Dharma is the firm foundation upon which the entire universe rests
- Parent school: Banaras Hindu University
- Established: 1924; 102 years ago
- School type: Law School
- Dean: Prof. P.K.Singh
- Location: Varanasi, Uttar Pradesh, India
- Website: Faculty of Law

Faculty of Law, Banaras Hindu University also known as the Law School, BHU is a faculty in the Banaras Hindu University, Varanasi, India which offers undergraduate, postgraduate and doctorate courses in legal education. It was founded in 1924.

== History ==
Started in 1924, Faculty of Law was one of the first faculties in the Banaras Hindu University. Initially classes started in the rooms of the Faculty of Arts, (Arts College), by the part-time teachers; mostly learned Advocates from Allahabad High Court.

Mahamana Pandit Madan Mohan Malviya served as the first dean of the faculty for three years.

== Publications ==
The Faculty of Law publishes the biannual Journal Banaras Law Journal.

== Rankings ==
University rankings

Law – India
- NIRF (2022): 20
- India Today (2022): 8
- Government colleges
- Outlook India (2022): 10

The Faculty of Law, Banaras Hindu University was ranked 20 among law schools in India by the National Institutional Ranking Framework (NIRF) in 2022. It was ranked 10 by Outlook India's "Top 13 Government Law Institutes In India" of 2022 and eighth among law colleges by India Today.

== Notable alumni ==
- Satya Vyas, Hindi author

== See also ==
- Banaras Hindu University
- List of educational institutions in Varanasi
