= Lawrence Ponoroff =

American legal academic

Lawrence Ponoroff is an American attorney and academic administrator, currently serving as a professor of law at the Michigan State University College of Law. He formerly served as the Dean of Tulane University Law School and the University of Arizona James E. Rogers College of Law.

== Education ==
Ponoroff earned a Bachelor of Arts from the Loyola University Chicago and a Juris Doctor from Stanford Law School.

== Career ==
After graduating from law school, Ponoroff practiced law for eight years (including two as a partner) and taught at several institutions, including the University of Michigan Law School and Wayne State University Law School. Ponoroff also worked as a staff attorney at the Administrative Office of the United States Courts and as an advisory member of the Judicial Conference of the United States.

Ponoroff worked as a professor at Tulane University Law School and served as dean from 2001–2009, succeeding Edward F. Sherman. Ponoroff was also the Samuel M. Fegtly Chair in Commercial Law while at James E. Rogers College of Law, where he served as dean until 2016. Ponoroff became dean of Michigan State University College of Law in 2016.

He is a leading expert on bankruptcy, and held several national appointments to bankruptcy law committees, including the Advisory Committee on Bankruptcy Rules to the Judicial Conference of the United States. He is known for authoring the Making and Doing Deals and Core Concepts of Commercial Law casebooks.

== Publications ==
Ponoroff has authored numerous articles in bankruptcy journals and at law reviews at Tulane, NYU, Northwestern, the University of Michigan, and other institutions. He has also written several notable casebooks used by U.S. law students.

=== Books ===
- Bankruptcy: Dealing with Financial Failure for Individuals and Businesses, (with Epstein & Markell) (fourth edition 2016)
- Making and Doing Deals: Contracts in Context, (with Epstein and Markell), with Teacher's Manual, LexisNexis (2002) (Fifth edition 2018).
- Core Concepts of Commercial Law: Past, Present & Future, (with Dolan and Markell), with Teacher's Manual, Thompson/West (2004).
- Supplement to Basic Concepts in Commercial Law, with Revised Teacher's Manual, Thompson/West (2000).
- Basic Concepts in Commercial Law: Cases and Materials, (with Dolan), with Teacher's Manual, Thompson/West (1998).
- Commercial Bankruptcy Litigation (with Snyder), Thompson/West (originally Clark Boardman & Co.) (1989 and supps.).

=== Articles ===
- Rethinking Chapter 13, 59 Arizona State Law Journal 1 (2017)
- Constitutional Limitations of State-Enacted Bankruptcy Exemptions and the Long Overdue Case fore Uniform Exemptions", 88 American Bankruptcy Law Journal (selected for Editors' Prize)
- Principles of Preclusion and Estoppel in Bankruptcy Cases, (co-authored), 79 American Bankruptcy Law Journal 839 (2006).
- The Immovable Object Versus the Irresistible Force: Rethinking the Relationship Between Secured Credit and Bankruptcy Policy, (co-authored), 95 U. MICH. L. REV. 2234 (1997).
- Exemption Limitations: A Tale of Two Solutions, 71 AM. BANKR. L.J. 221 (1997).
- Vicarious Thrills: The Case for Application of Agency Rules in Bankruptcy Dischargeability Litigation, 70 TUL. L. REV. 2515 (1996).
- Construction Claims in Bankruptcy: Making the Best of a Bad Situation, 11 BANKR. DEV. J. 343; reprinted in THE LAW OF DISTRESSED REAL ESTATE (West Group 2001) (1995).
- Debtors Who Convert Their Assets on the Eve of Bankruptcy: Villains or Victims of the Fresh Start, (co-authored), 70 N.Y.U. L. Rev. 235 (1995).
- Now You See It, Now You Don't: An Unceremonious Encore for Two-Transfer Thinking in the Analysis of Indirect Preferences, 69 AM. BANKR. L.J. 203 (1995).
- The Implied Good Faith Filing Requirement: Sentinel of an Evolving Bankruptcy Policy, (co-authored), 85 NW. U. L. REV.919 (1991), reprinted in Charles Tabb, BANKRUPTCY ANTHOLOGY (Anderson Publications 2001).

Academic offices
Preceded by Edward F. Sherman	Tulane University Law School Dean; June 2001 – 2009	Succeeded by David Meyer
