= Cary Coglianese =

American legal scholar

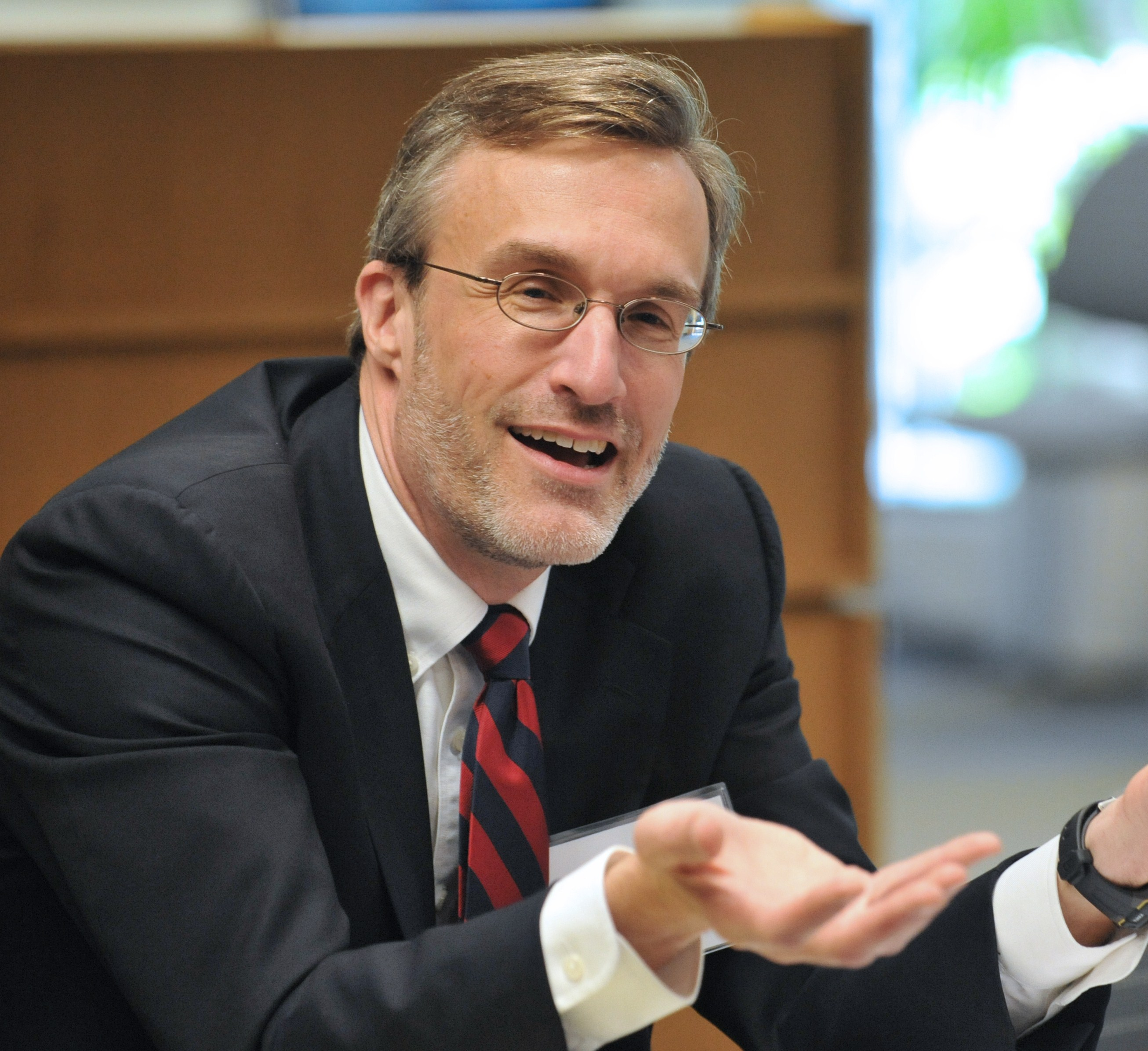

Academic background
- Education: College of Idaho (BA); University of Michigan (JD, PhD)

Academic work
- Discipline: Administrative Law; Government Regulation; Environmental Law
- Institutions: University of Pennsylvania Law School, John F. Kennedy School of Government, Stanford, Vanderbilt

Cary Coglianese (/ˌkɒləˈniːsi/) is an American legal scholar who is the Edward B. Shils Professor of Law and professor of political science at the University of Pennsylvania Law School, where he is also director of the Penn Program on Regulation.

== Career ==
Coglianese specializes in the study of regulation and regulatory processes with a particular emphasis on the empirical evaluation of alternative regulatory strategies and the role of disputes, negotiation, and business-government relations in regulatory policy making. He founded and is the faculty advisor to The Regulatory Review, a daily source of regulatory, news, analysis and opinion. He also created Erulemaking.org, a site dedicated to technological and institutional issues related to e-rulemaking and which makes research papers, policy documents, and conference materials accessible to those interested in the use of information technology in the regulatory process. Together with John Braithwaite and David Levi-Faur, Coglianese served as a founding editor of the peer-reviewed journal Regulation & Governance.

Prior to joining Penn Law, Coglianese served on the faculty at the John F. Kennedy School of Government (1994–2006) where he was the founding chair of the school's Regulatory Policy Program and director of its Politics Research Group. He founded the Law and Society Association's international collaborative research network on regulatory governance, served as a Council member of the American Bar Association's Section of Administrative Law and Regulatory Practice, and served as Vice Chair of the Innovation, Management Systems, and Trading Committee of the American Bar Association's section on Environment, Energy, and Resources. He has taught as a visiting professor at the Stanford and Vanderbilt law schools, and has served as the Deputy Dean of Academic Affairs at the University of Pennsylvania Law School. He is a public member of the Administrative Conference of the United States and the chair of the Conference's rulemaking committee.

Coglianese holds a JD, a PhD in political science and a master's in public policy all from the University of Michigan. His undergraduate degree is from the College of Idaho.

== Books ==
- Achieving Regulatory Excellence (2016)
- Does Regulation Kill Jobs? (with Adam M. Finkel and Christopher Carrigan) (2013)
- Regulatory Breakdown: The Crisis of Confidence in U.S. Regulation (2012)
- Import Safety: Regulatory Governance in the Global Economy (with Adam M. Finkel and David Zaring) (2009)
- Regulation and Regulatory Processes (with Robert A. Kagan) (2007)
- Leveraging the Private Sector: Management-based Strategies for Improving Environmental Performance (with Jennifer Nash) (2006)
- Regulating from the Inside: Can Environmental Management Systems Achieve Policy Goals? (with Jennifer Nash) (2001)

== Selected publications ==
- Regulating by Robot: Administrative Decision Making in the Machine-Learning Era, Georgetown Law Journal (2017) (with David Lehr)
- Chevron’s Intersitial Steps, George Washington Law Review (2017)
- On the Pitfalls of Performance Standards, The Regulatory Review (Nov. 20, 2017)
