= Kevin Omar Mohammed =

Canadian citizen convicted of a terrorism related offense

- Born: 1992 (age 33–34); Canada
- Other names: Abu Khalid; Abu Jayyid
- Occupation: student
- Known for: charged, tried and imprisoned for trying to join ISIS

Kevin Omar Mohammed (born 1992) is a Canadian citizen who was convicted for travelling to Syria to join Jabhat al-Nusra.

According to counter-terrorism expert Mubin Sheikh, who had been in touch with Mohammed on social media dating back to 2014, Mohammed's background was West Indian-Canadian, not South Asian-Canadian, and he had considered joining an al Qaeda affiliated group.

In 2014, Mohammed traveled to Turkey and was smuggled across the border into Syria by members of Jabhat al-Nusra. There is no evidence that Mohammed committed any offenses while in Syria for which he could face charges. Family members, concerned for his welfare, followed him and convinced him to return to Canada.

== Terrorist threat ==
Mohammed tweeted a request for a copy of the version of the video game Call of Duty where terrorists massacre unarmed civilians at an airport, two days after terrorist massacred civilians at an airport. He attached to his tweet a screenshot showing terrorists massacring civilians. Security officials monitoring his social media picked him up the same day.

After his return to Canada, Mohammed's social media activity triggered scrutiny.

In 2015, analysts noticed that he stopped making tweets that supported the activities of ISIS in favour of the less radical al Qaeda affiliated Jabhat al-Nusra; however, an online request he made two days after radical jihadists attacked an airport in Brussels triggered his arrest. Mohammed requested a customized scenario of the video game Call of Duty set in the Brussels airport that had just been attacked, which would allow him to play the role of one of the attackers. Attached to the tweet in which he made this request, Mohammed placed an image, from the perspective of a shooter, of unarmed civilian airport patrons being slaughtered.

Commenting on the image attached to that tweet, counter-terrorism expert Mubin Sheikh told the CBC:

"All kinds of kids play those kind of games every day. That in itself is not a problem. But the day after a terrorist attack in a Belgian airport, and you show a screenshot of an airport being shot up — that's so closely linked. Anybody saying something that shows sympathy for that attack is going to (get a) visit from the government."

== Trial and parole hearings ==
Mohammed initially faced a weapons charge when a search of his home found a large knife. That charge was dropped and he was later tried for "participating in or contributing to, directly or indirectly, any activity of a terrorist group for the purpose of enhancing the ability of any terrorist group to facilitate or carry out a terrorist activity." He pled guilty in June 2017, and was convicted on October 31, 2017. The maximum sentence he could have received was ten years, but Mohammed received a sentence of 4 1/2 years after agreeing to plead guilty. Taking into account the time he was in custody, prior to his conviction, he will serve just two years. His sentence includes a requirement that he participate in a de-radicalization program while in custody, that he be monitored for a further three years after his release, and that he not access the internet for three years. However, when the parole board considered his case in February 2019, it noted he had not participated in a de-radicalization program.

Details of Mohammed's activities and of security officials investigation into him weren't made public until he was sentenced on October 31, 2017.

In May 2018, Toronto Sun columnist Anthony Furey claimed that there are approximately 60 individuals who had returned to Canada from Daesh, but described Mohammed as the only notable conviction. In July 2018, Rebecca Louis, writing in the Western Journal of Legal Studies, recognized other notable convictions of individuals returning from Daesh.
