= MJIL =

MJIL may refer to:

Masters of Jurisprudence in Indian Law

- Melbourne Journal of International Law
- Minnesota Journal of International Law
