= Edward F. Sherman =

American legal scholar

- Born: 1937; El Paso, Texas
- Died: 7 June 2022 (aged 84); Washington DC
- Citizenship: USA
- Education: Georgetown University (BA); Harvard Law School (LLM, SJD); Texas Western University (MA)
- Awards: 2004 winner of the ABA Robert B. McKay Award for the law professor who had contributed most to the advancement of justice, scholarship and the legal profession
- Scientific career
- Fields: Law
- Workplaces: Tulane University Law School

Edward F. Sherman was an American legal scholar who served as the 20th dean of the Tulane University Law School from 1996 to 2001. After his tenure as dean, he continued to teach at the law school until his retirement in 2015. Prior to this appointment, he taught at numerous law schools, including the University of Texas Law School, where he taught for 19 years. His scholarship focused on Civil Procedure and Alternative Dispute Resolution. Working with USAID he helped Vietnam write a new code of civil procedure. In 1970, he was a founding board member of the Lawyers Military Defense Committee, which provided free civilian counsel to U.S. military members in Vietnam and West Germany.

== Education ==
Sherman earned his BA from Georgetown University in 1959, his LLM and SJD from Harvard Law School in 1962 and 1981 respectively, and his MAs in English and History from Texas Western University in 1962 and 1967.

== Policy stances ==
Sherman believed that clients should generally attend ADR proceedings, and that there should be an exception to the mediator-confidentiality privilege when a court needs to obtain information relevant to determining compliance with a court order to participate in ADR in good faith.

== Awards ==
- 2004 winner of the ABA Robert B. McKay Award for the law professor who had contributed most to the advancement of justice, scholarship and the legal profession.

== Publications ==
Sherman authored or edited 19 books and has contributed chapters to 20 more. He has also authored over 50 articles, including two in the Yale Law Journal. Some of his more widely-known contributions are listed below.

=== Books ===
- Processes of Dispute Resolution: The Role of Lawyers (with Rau & Peppet) (Foundation Press 4th ed. 2006).
- Civil Procedure: A Modern Approach (with Marcus & Redish) (West Pub. Co. 1988, 1995, 2000, 4th ed. 2005).
- Complex Litigation: Cases and Materials on Advanced Civil Procedure (with Marcus) (West Pub. Co. 1985, 1992, 1998, 4th ed. 2004).
- Texas ADR & Aribration: Statutes and Commentary (with Rau and Shannon) (West Group 3rd ed.) (2000).
- ADR and Civil Procedure (translated by Prof. Masahiko Omura) (Chuo Univ. Press 1997).
- Cases and Materials on Military Law: The Scope of Military Authority in a Democracy (with Zillman & Blaustein) (Matthew Bender 1978).

=== Articles ===
- "The MDL Model for Resolving Complex Litigation If a Class Action Is Not Possible," 82 TUL. L. REV. ___ (2008).
- “Consumer Class Actions: Decline and Fall?,” ABA JOURNAL 51 (June 2007).
- “Evolving Military Justice,” 67 Journal of Military History 999 (July 2003).
- The Evolution of American Civil Trial Process Towards Greater Congruence with Continental Trial Practice, 7 TUL. J. INT'L & COMP. L. 125 (1999).
- Introduction: A Tribute to Professor Athanassios Yiannopoulos, 73 TUL. L. REV. 1017 (1999).
- From “Loser Pays” to Modified Offer of Judgment Rules: Reconciling Incentives to Settle with Access to Justice, 76 TEX. L. REV. 1863 (1998).
- "Good Faith" Participation in Mediation: Aspirational, Not Mandatory, 4 DISP. RES. MAG. 14 (1997).
- Confidentiality in ADR Proceedings: Policy Issues Arising from the Texas Experience, 38 S. TEX. L. REV. 541 (1997).
- A Process Model and Agenda for Civil Justice Reforms in the States, 46 STAN. L. REV. 1553 (1994).
- Managing Complex Litigation: Procedures and Strategies for Lawyers and Courts, 57 TEX. B.J. 149 (1994).
- Court-Mandated Alternative Dispute Resolution: What Form of Participation Should Be Required?, 46 S.M.U. L. REV. 2079 (1993).
- The Immigration Laws and the “Right to Hear” Protected by Academic Freedom, 66 TEX. L. REV. 1547 (1988).
- Restructuring the Trial Process in the Age of Complex Litigation, 63 TEX. L. REV. 721 (1984).
- Traditional and Developing Concepts of Governmental Liability, INST. ON PUBLIC LAW LIABILITY OF PUBLIC OFFICIALS AND EMPLOYEES (State Bar of Texas, 1981).
- The Development, Discovery, and Use of Computer Support Systems in Achieving Efficiency in Litigation, 79 COLUM. L. REV. 267 (1979).
- A Special Kind of Justice, 84 YALE L.J. 373 (1974).
- Military Justice Without Military Control, 82 YALE L.J. 1398 (1973).
- Congressional Proposals for Reform of Military Law, 10 AM. CRIM. L. REV. 25 (1971).
- The Right to Representation by Out-of-State Attorneys in Civil Rights Cases, 4 HARV. C.R.-C.L. L. REV. 65 (1968).
- The Use of Public Opinion Polls in Continuance and Venue Hearings, 50 A.B.A. J. 357 (1964).

Academic offices
Preceded by John R. Kramer	Tulane University Law School Dean; July 1996 – June 2001	Succeeded by Lawrence Ponoroff
