= James McConvill =

Australian lawyer

James McConvill is an Australian lawyer (Note: But not an Australian legal practitioner, which is the term for a person who is authorised to engage in legal practice in Australia.) who has been a legal scholar, and also a writer and lecturer.

He is the editor of the international corporate governance journal, The Corporate Governance Law Review. He works at Victoria University, Melbourne, where he takes corporations law and looks after the Master's degree and Doctorate students.

== Education and career ==
After completing law school from Deakin University, McConvill worked as a corporate lawyer for three years with the Australian firm, Allens Arthur Robinson (AAR). Following his time at AAR, he worked at Deakin University and La Trobe University before becoming a principal at The Corporate Research Group, International, an Australian think-tank on corporate governance, his academic specialty. He has also become director of the Asia-Pacific Centre for American Law.

== Writings ==
=== Books ===
McConvill has written several books on corporate government and related subjects

- Principles of contemporary corporate governance, by J J Du Plessis; James McConvill; Mirko Bagaric. Cambridge [England]; New York: Cambridge University Press, 2005. ISBN 978-0-521-61783-3
- Shareholder participation and the corporation: a fresh inter-disciplinary approach in happiness. by James McConvill. Abingdon [England]; New York: Routledge-Cavendish, 2006. ISBN 978-1-84568-011-4
- In the pursuit of truth: reflections on law, life and contemporary affairs by James McConvill South Yarra, Vic. : Sandstone Academic Press, ©2006. ISBN 978-0-9757839-2-4
- Coming down the mountain: rethinking takeovers regulation in Australia by James McConvillSouth Yarra Victoria, Australia: Sandstone Academic Press, 2006. ISBN 978-0-9757839-1-7
- An introduction to CLERP 9 by James McConvill. Chatswood, N.S.W. : LexisNexis, 2004. ISBN 978-0-409-32181-4
- The false promise of pay for performance: embracing a positive model of the company executive by James McConvill. South Yarra, Victoria, Australia: Sandstone Academic Press, 2005. ISBN 978-0-9757839-0-0

=== Articles ===
He has also written at least 50 peer-reviewed articles in American, British, German, and Australian legal journals.

=== Fraser controversy ===
McConvill gained national attention in Australia during 2005, when editor of the Deakin Law Review, for agreeing to publish an article called "Rethinking the White Australia Policy" by Professor Drew Fraser. The article was withdrawn after the Sudanese community in Australia threatened to sue Deakin University. Media at the time reported concerns that the article was both racist and xenophobic.
