= ETL =

ETL may refer to:

== Telecommunications ==
- Econet Telecom Lesotho
- Ericsson Telephones Limited, a defunct British telephone equipment manufacture
- Eutelsat, a European satellite operator

== Transport ==
- ETL, National Rail station code for East Tilbury railway station, in Essex, England
- Electric Traction Limited, a British rolling stock leasing company
- ETL, reporting code for Essex Terminal Railway, in Ontario, Canada
- Express toll lane, similar to a High-occupancy toll lane, expressway lane reserved for toll-paying vehicles

== Other uses ==
- Ephemerides Theologicae Lovanienses, a theological journal
- ETL Group, a German management consultancy firm
- ETL SEMKO, an electrical certification company
- European Transport Law, a scholarly journal
- Expected tail loss, a measure of financial risk
- Extract, transform, load, a data processing concept
