= Truth Without Reconciliation =

2018 non-fiction book

Truth Without Reconciliation: A Human Rights History of Ghana
- Author: Abena Ampofoa Asare
- Publisher: University of Pennsylvania Press
- Publication date: 2018
- ISBN: 9780812250398
- OCLC: 1041139857

Truth Without Reconciliation: A Human Rights History of Ghana is a book by American academic Abena Ampofoa Asare. It was published in 2018 by University of Pennsylvania Press as part of their Pennsylvania Studies in Human Rights series.

== Author ==
Abena Ampofoa Asare is an American academic and associate professor of Modern African Affairs & History at Stony Brook University. Her family moved to the United States from Ghana in the 1980s.

== Content ==
Truth Without Reconciliation is based on the archives and stories gathered of Ghana's National Reconciliation Commission(NRC), a commission established by the government of Ghana to document human rights abuses in the country from the 1950s to the 1990s. In the book, Ampofoa Asare argues that the NRC functioned more as a public history project than either a nationalistic attempt to create a new history for Ghana or an academic attempt to discover the truth. She examines many of the stories that she read in the NRC archives, and combines them with historical background as well as with the history of the NRC itself.

== Reception ==
Reviews of the book were generally positive. In a book review published by Contemporary Justice Review, Robert Ame described Truth Without Reconciliation as a "well-researched, critical, and historical masterpiece" with a "unique approach" to Ghana's truth commissions. Ame commented favourably about Asare's decision to avoid describing the commissions "as either good or bad", instead seeing the stories archived by it as a "snapshot of Ghanaians’ perceptions". Similarly, Kwasi Konadu described the book as "thoughtful" in its focus on Ghanaian's lived experiences. However, his review argues that because NRC did not examine the actions of powerful corporations and leaders such as Jerry Rawlings, he, unlike Ampofoa Asare, viewed the historical human rights abuses in Ghana as a product of ideologies that could not be solved by recording stories or through truth commissions. Tawia Ansah, in the African Journal of Legal Studies, was somewhat more critical. She disagreed with Ampofoa Asare's worries that sharing these stories with a wide audience could contribute to the victimization of African women. She referred to Ampofoa Asare's attempts to document the stories as "unexceptionable" in the world of academia, and argues that she, sometimes, "succumbs to a totalistic view of Ghana’s political reality". However, she also describes Ampofoa Asare's attempt to record unclear stories with no clear line between the victims and the abusers as "bold", and compares it favourably to other, similar attempts that Ansah feels "risk falling prey to [their] own redundancy".
