= Paul Finn (judge) =

Australian judge

Paul Desmond Finn (22 April 1946 – 27 September 2023) was an Australian academic jurist and judge of the Federal Court of Australia.

== Early life and education ==
Finn was born on 22 April 1946 in Brisbane. His father died when Finn was a child. He completed a Bachelor of Arts degree at the University of Queensland, majoring in literature. Although his father and stepfather were both lawyers, Finn was never pressured into following them into the legal profession; in an interview in 2010, he stated: "I did law by default, probably a lack of imagination".

He later completed a PhD at Gonville and Caius College, Cambridge, England, Finn won the Yorke Prize in his final year, and this treatise formed the basis of Finn's 1977 book Fiduciary Obligations.

== Academic career ==
After completing his doctorate, Finn joined the Law Faculty at the University of Queensland as a senior lecturer. Two years later, he moved to the Australian National University, where he remained until 1995. He became a Professor of Law in 1988 and was appointed Head of the Department of Law in the same year.

Finn has authored and edited a number of books and journal articles, including Law and Government in Colonial Australia, which was published in 1987 by Oxford University Press. He has also served on the editorial boards of Public Law Review, the University of Queensland Law Journal, the Australian Journal of Legal History and Uniform Law Review.

In 2008, he was awarded an honorary degree in law from Flinders University.

== Legal career ==
Finn was appointed a judge of the Federal Court of Australia in 1995. He later reflected that this appointment was for him "wholly unexpected" given his experience: it is unusual for an individual with an academic background to be appointed a judge, and he had not been in a courtroom for 25 years.

He provided advice to the 1992 WA Inc Royal Commission on "the manner in which the issues confronting this Commission have been dealt with elsewhere in Australia and in other Western democracies".

Finn retired as a judge in 2012. He died in North Adelaide on 27 September 2023.
