= San Diego International Law Journal =

- Discipline: International law
- Language: English
- Edited by: Jason Musni (Vol. 28, current)

Publication details
- History: 1999–present
- Publisher: University of San Diego (United States)
- Frequency: Biannual

Standard abbreviations
- Bluebook: San Diego Int'l L.J.
- ISO 4: San Diego Int. Law J.

Indexing
- ISSN: 2995-1054
- LCCN: 2002235604
- OCLC no.: 54398088

Links
- Journal homepage

The San Diego International Law Journal is a peer-reviewed, student-run law journal covering international law at the University of San Diego School of Law. It publishes scholarly articles and student notes on issues of international, comparative, and foreign law.

The journal has been cited by the United States Court of Appeals for the Seventh Circuit, the United States District Court for the Eastern District of Texas, the United States District Court for the Northern District of Georgia, the International Bank for Reconstruction and Development division of the World Bank, and the European Journal of International Law.

== Abstracting and indexing ==
The journal is abstracted and indexed in EBSCO databases, HeinOnline, LexisNexis, and Westlaw. It is also indexed in Scopus.

== See also ==
- List of law journals
- List of international law journals
- List of law reviews in the United States
