= Legal education =

Education in topics related to law

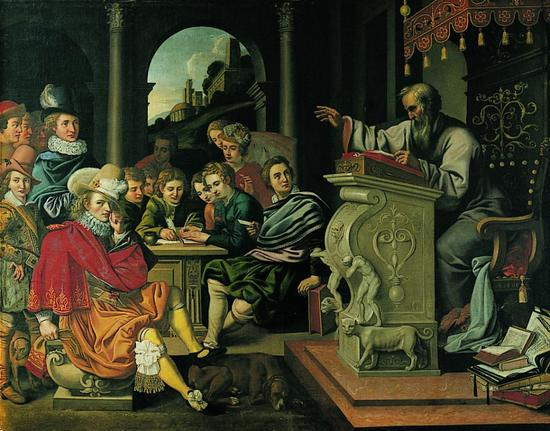
A lecture on rhetoric in a knight academy, painted in the 1620s by Pieter Isaacsz or Reinhold Timm for Rosenborg Castle.

Legal education is the education of individuals in the principles, practices, and theory of law. It may be undertaken for several reasons, including to provide the knowledge and skills necessary for admission to legal practice in a particular jurisdiction, to provide a greater breadth of knowledge to those working in other professions such as politics or business, to provide current lawyers with advanced training or greater specialisation, or to update lawyers on recent developments in the law.

Legal education can take the form of a variety of programs, including:

- Primary degrees in law, which may be studied at either undergraduate or graduate level depending on the country.
- Advanced academic degrees in law, such as masters and doctoral degrees.
- Practice or training courses, which prospective lawyers are required to pass in some countries before they may enter practice.
- Applied or specialised law accreditation, which are less formal than degree programs but which provide specialised certification in particular areas.
- Continuing legal education, which do not lead to a qualification but provide practicing lawyers with updates on recent legal developments.

== History ==
Early Western legal education emerged in Republican Rome. Initially those desiring to be advocates would train in schools of rhetoric. Around the third century BC Tiberius Coruncanius began teaching law as a separate discipline. His public legal instruction had the effect of creating a class of legally skilled non-priests (jurisprudentes), a sort of consultancy. After Coruncanius' death, instruction gradually became more formal, with the introduction of books on law beyond the then scant official Roman legal texts. It is possible that Coruncanius allowed members of the public and students to attend consultations with citizens in which he provided legal advice. These consultations were probably held outside the College of Pontiffs, and thus accessible to all those interested.

Canon and ecclesiastical law were studied in universities in medieval Europe. However, institutions providing education in the domestic law of each country emerged later in the eighteenth century.

In England, legal education emerged in the late thirteenth century through apprenticeships. The Inns of Court controlled admission to practice and also provided some legal training. English universities had taught Roman and canon law for some time, but formal degrees focused on the native common law did not emerge until the 1800s.

William Blackstone was in favor of a general academic foundation prior to the study of common law:

For sciences are of a sociable disposition, and flourish best in the neighbourhood of each other: nor is there any branch of learning but may be helped and improved by assistances drawn from other arts.

Students of common law would, according to Blackstone, benefit from the study of classical writers, logic, mathematics, philosophical ideas of art and nature, so that "if he has impressed on his mind the sound maxims of the law of nature, the best and most authentic foundation of human laws" and the reduction of such maxims to "a practical system in the laws of imperial Rome", then the student would enter the study if law "with incredible advantage and reputation". Blackstone also recommends that students take "a year or two's farther leisure" at the conclusion of their formal legal study to establish a "solid scientifical method" as the foundation of his future practice, so that he would afterwards "proceed with the greatest ease, and will unfold the most intricate points with an intuitive rapidity and clearness".

== Forms ==
=== Primary degrees in law ===
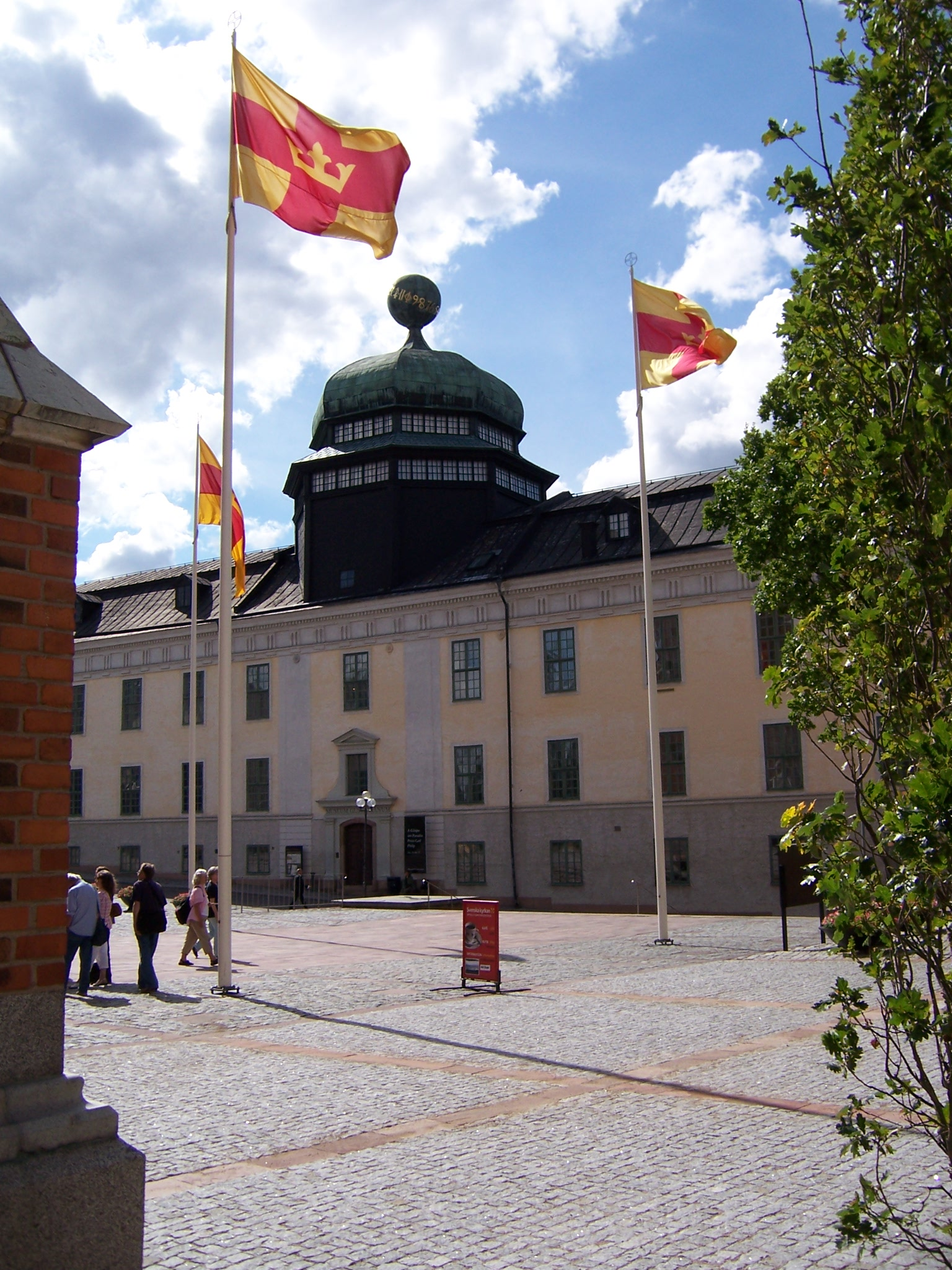
Gustavianum, The Swedish Uppsala University built 1622–1625 and now a museum, was one of the pioneers in formal legal education

In many countries, including most of those in the Commonwealth of Nations, the principal law degree is an undergraduate degree, usually known as a Bachelor of Laws (LLB). Graduates of such a program are eligible to become lawyers by passing the country's equivalent of a bar exam. In these countries, graduate law programs are advanced degrees which allow for more in-depth study or specialisation.

In the United States and Canada, the primary law degree is a graduate degree known as the Juris Doctor (JD). Students may pursue such a degree only after completing an undergraduate degree, usually a bachelor's degree. The undergraduate degree can be in any field, though most American lawyers hold bachelor's degrees in the humanities and social sciences. American law schools are usually an autonomous entity within a larger university.

Primary degrees in law are offered by law schools, known in some countries as faculties of law. Law schools may have varying degrees of autonomy within a particular university or, in some countries, can be entirely independent of any other post-secondary educational institution.

=== Advanced degrees in law ===
Higher degrees allow for more advanced academic study. These include the Masters of Law (LLM) by coursework or research, and doctoral degrees such as the PhD or SJD.

Practitioners may undertake a Masters of Law by coursework to obtain greater specialisation in an area in which they practice. In many common law countries, a higher degree in law is common and expected for legal academics. In addition, incorporating practical skills is beneficial for practitioners seeking higher degrees to better prepare them in their respective legal area of practice.

In contrast, higher degrees in law are uncommon in the United States, even within the academy.

=== Practice or training courses ===
In some countries, including the United Kingdom, Italy, Germany, Canada and all Australian jurisdictions, the final stages of vocational legal education required to qualify to practice law are carried out outside the university system. The requirements for qualification as a barrister or as a solicitor are covered in those articles.

=== Applied law programs or specialist accreditation ===
Legal education providers in some countries offer courses which lead to a certificate or accreditation in applied legal practice or a particular specialisation.

=== Continuing legal education ===
Continuing legal education (also known as continuing professional development) programs are informal seminars or short courses which provide legal practitioners with an opportunity to update their knowledge and skills throughout their legal career. In some jurisdictions, it is mandatory to undertake a certain amount of continuing legal education each year.

== By country ==
=== Australia ===
In Australia most universities offer law as an undergraduate-entry course (LLB, 4 years), or combined degree course (e.g., BSc/LLB, BCom/LLB, BA/LLB, BE/LLB, 5–6 years). Some of these also offer a three-year postgraduate Juris Doctor (JD) program. Bond University in Queensland runs three full semesters each year, teaching from mid-January to late December. This enables the Bond University Law Faculty to offer the LLB in the usual 8 semesters, but only 2 2/3 years. They also offer a JD in two years. The University of Technology, Sydney will from 2010 offer a 2-year accelerated JD program.

In 2008, the University of Melbourne introduced the Melbourne Model, whereby Law is only available as a graduate degree, with students having to have completed a three-year bachelor's degree (usually an Arts degree) before being eligible. Students in combined degree programs would spend the first 3 years completing their first bachelor's degree together with some preliminary law subjects, and then spend the last 2–3 years completing the law degree (JD). Alternatively, one can finish any bachelor's degree, and providing their academic results are high, apply for graduate-entry into a 3-year LLB program. Australian Law Schools include those at the University of New England, Australian Catholic University, Australian National University, La Trobe University, Flinders University, Bond University, Macquarie, Monash, Deakin, UNSW, University of Tasmania, Adelaide, Victoria University, Sydney, Melbourne, RMIT University Law School, Queensland University of Technology, the University of Queensland, the University of Western Australia and the University of Canberra.

=== Canada ===
The professional law degree in Canada is the Bachelor of Laws (LL.B.) / Juris Doctor (J.D.) for common law jurisdictions, and the Bachelor of Laws, Licentiate of Law or Bachelor of Civil Law (LL.B./LL.L./B.C.L.) for Quebec, a civil law jurisdiction. Quebec civil law degrees (and the transsystemic B.C.L../J.D. [previously called B.C.L./LL.B.] program at McGill University) are undergraduate-entry—students can be admitted directly after Quebec's pre-university college program (Diplôme d'études collégiales).

Admittance to an LL.B. (also called J.D.) program in common law requires at least two years of undergraduate education, although a completed undergraduate degree is usually required. In practice, the vast majority of those who are admitted have already earned at least an undergraduate (bachelor's) degree. The change in academic nomenclature re-designating the common law degree as a J.D. rather than an LL.B., currently completed or under consideration at a number of Canadian schools, has not affected the level of instruction—it is the same degree.

=== Germany ===
In Germany, law degrees historically did not exist and were unnecessary for legal practice. Now, those who wish to enter the legal profession must study in universities, for which the standard curriculum length is 4 and 1/2 years. Some law schools have also begun to award the Diplom-Jurist degree. German students enter into law school after high school (Gymnasium) graduation.

After their studies, candidates complete the First State Examination. In the First State Exam, 30% of the exam is on a specialized area of law, chosen by the examinee, which is organized and carried out by the university. In practice, the more important part is the 70% of obligatory areas of law examined by the Justizprüfungsamt, a body of the state administration of justice. Failure rates of the 1st State Examination can be up to 30%. The written part concerns the analysis of legal issues.

After passing the 1st State Examination, candidates undertake a two-year legal traineeship ("Referendariat"), organized by the Federal States. After the legal traineeship, candidates must take the 2nd State Examination, with failure rates far lower than in the 1st State Examination. The written exam consists of drafting judgments, contract and other legal documents; there is also an oral exam. After passing the 2nd State Exam, the trainee may become a lawyer.

=== Hong Kong ===
In Hong Kong law can be studied as a four-year undergraduate degree Bachelor of Laws (LLB), a two-year postgraduate degree (Juris Doctor), or the Common Professional Examination conversion course for non-law graduates. One must then pass the one-year Postgraduate Certificate in Laws (PCLL) currently offered at the University of Hong Kong (HKU), Chinese University of Hong Kong and City University of Hong Kong, before starting vocational training: a year's pupillage for barristers or a two-year training contract for solicitors.

The move to a four-year LLB was recent and, in the case of HKU, was aimed at shifting some of the more theoretical aspects of the HKU PCLL into the LLB, leaving more room for practical instruction.

=== India ===
The Bar Council of India prescribes and supervises standard of legal education in India. Law degrees in India are granted and conferred in terms of the Advocates Act, 1961, which is a law passed by the Parliament both on the aspect of legal education and also regulation of conduct of legal profession. Various regional universities or specialised national law universities offer Law graduate degrees through various law schools.

In India law can be studied, as LL.B. (Bachelor of Laws) or B.L. (Bachelor of Law), a three-year graduate degree after completion of Bachelor's degree. Alternatively after standard 12 one can join an integrated five-year law course which provides option to avail B.A. LL.B. or B.B.A. LLB. or B.Sc. LL.B. In India applied legal education for specific branches of law is also offered such as, Business law, Human resource and Labour laws, Property laws, Family laws, Human rights & Legal awareness, Taxation law and many more.

=== Italy and France ===
Law in Italy and France is studied in a jurisprudence school which is an entity within a larger university. Legal education can be started immediately after obtained a Diploma. Italian and French law schools are affiliated with public universities, and are thus public institutions. As a consequence, law schools are required to admit anyone holding the baccalaureate. However, the failure rate is extremely high (up to 70%) during the first two years of the "licenza in diritto". There are no vast disparities in the quality of Southern European law schools. Many schools focus on their respective city and region.

The law school program is divided following the European standards for university studies (Bologna process):

- first a license of law program (Licence de droit): three-year period
- Then a Master of law program (Master de droit): two-year period
- Ph.D. in law (Doctorat en droit): three-year period (often more).

The first year of the master program (M1) is specialized: public law, private law, business law, European and international law, etc.

The second year of the master of law program (M2) can be work-oriented or research oriented (the students write a substantial thesis and can apply to doctoral programs, e.g., a PhD in law).

The second year is competitive (entry is based on the student's grades and overall score and on extracurricular activities) and generally more specialized (IP law, contract law, civil liberties, etc.).

Students must pass a specific examination to enter bar school (CRFPA, école du barreau). They must successfully finish the first year of a Master of law (M1 or maitrise de droit) to be able to attend.

If they succeed, then after 18 months (school, practical aspects, ethics and internship) they then take the CAPA exam and diploma(Certificat d'Aptitude à la Profession d'Avocat). Successful students also take the Oath in order to practice law.

=== Japan ===
The Japanese Ministry of Justice opened the University of Tokyo Faculty of Law in 1877 (changed to Imperial University in 1886). To matriculate to the University of Tokyo, students had to finish ten to fifteen years of compulsory education; acceptance was therefore available to only a small elite. The law program produced politically dependable graduates to fill fast-track administrative positions in government, also known as high civil servants (koto bunkan), and to serve as judges and prosecutors.

Private law schools opened around 1880. These lacked the government funding given to the University of Tokyo, so the quality of education there lagged behind. Students only had to pass an examination to matriculate to private law schools, so many of them had not completed middle school. The private law schools produced a large portion of private attorneys because their graduates were often ineligible to apply for government positions.

The Imperial University Faculty of Law was given supervisory authority over many private law schools in 1887; by the 1920s, it promulgated a legal curriculum comprising six basic codes: Constitutional Law, Civil Law, Commercial Law, Civil Procedure, Criminal Law, and Criminal Procedure. The same basic structure survived in Japanese legal education to the end of the twentieth century.

Prior to the implementation of the "law school system" in 2004, the legal education system was driven more by examinations than by formal schooling. The passage rate for the bar exam was historically around three percent, and nearly all those who sat for the exam took it several times. A number of specialized "cram schools" trained prospective lawyers for the exam, and these schools remain prevalent today. After passing the bar exam, prospective barristers were required to train for 16 months at the Legal Research and Training Institute of the Supreme Court of Japan. The training period has traditionally been devoted to litigation practice and virtually no training is given for other aspects of legal practice, e.g., contract drafting, legal research. During this period, the most "capable trainees" are "selected out" to become career judges; others may become prosecutors or private practitioners.

In 2004, the Japanese Diet passed a law allowing for the creation of graduate level law school law schools (法科大学院, hōka daigakuin) that offer a J.D., or Hōmu Hakushi (法務博士). The 2006 bar examination was first in Japanese history to require a law school degree as a prerequisite. In the past, although there has been no educational requirement, most of those who passed the examination had earned undergraduate degrees from "elite" Japanese universities such as the University of Tokyo, Kyoto University or Hitotsubashi University. With this new law school system came a new bar exam, with a 40–50% passage rate which is capped by a numerical quota. Applicants are now limited to taking the exam three times in a five-year period. Despite the much higher bar passage rate with the new exam, due to the quotas, approximately half of Japanese law school graduates will never be admitted to practice. The new system also reduced the apprenticeship period at the Legal Research and Training Institute to one year.

A number of other law-related professions exist in Japan, such as patent agents (benrishi), tax accountants (zeirishi), scriveners, etc., entry to each of which is governed by a separate examination. Attorneys ("bengoshi"), being qualified to practice any law, can automatically be qualified as patent agents and tax accountants with no additional examination, but not vice versa.

=== Korea ===
Legal education in Korea is driven by examination. The profession of barristers, is highly regulated, and the pass rate for the bar exam is around five percent. Prospective attorneys who do pass the exam usually take it two or three times before passing it, and a number of specialized "private educational institutes" exist for prospective lawyers. After passing the bar exam, prospective barristers undergo a two-year training period at the Judicial Research and Training Institute of the Supreme Court of Korea. During this period, the most capable trainees are "selected out" to become career judges; others may become prosecutors or private practitioners.

In 2007, the Korean government passed a law allowing for the creation of three-year law schools (법학전문대학원). According to the new law, the old system of selecting lawyers by examination will be phased out by 2013 and the U.S.-style law schools will be the sole route to become a lawyer.

In February 2008, the Ministry of Education of Korea selected 25 universities to open law schools. The total enrollment for all law schools is capped at 2,000, which is a source of contention between the powerful Korea Bar Association, and citizen groups and school administrators. There is an uproar among the schools which failed to get the government's approval and even among the schools that did get the approval, there is dissatisfaction due to an extremely low enrollment number. Several law schools are permitted to enroll 40 students per year, which is far below the financially sustainable number. Beginning in 2012, passage of the Lawyer Admission Test (which is distinct from the old bar exam) will be required for qualification to practice.

A number of other legal professions exist in Korea, such as patent attorneys (변리사), tax attorneys (세무사), solicitors(법무사), etc., entry to each of which is governed by a separate examination.

=== Malaysia ===
As a Commonwealth country, the Malaysian legal education system is rooted from the United Kingdom. Legal qualifications offered by the local law faculties require students to have a pre-university qualification such as the Malaysian Higher School Certificate, A-Level, International Baccalaureate, Foundation Course or a Diploma. Generally, the law degree programmes in Malaysia consist of civil law subjects, but there are institutions such as The National University of Malaysia, International Islamic University Malaysia and Universiti Sultan Zainal Abidin that include Sharia or Islamic law courses as requirements for admission and graduation.

Malaysian law graduates from universities in the UK, Australia or New Zealand are allowed to practice law in Malaysia. However, they are required to obtain a Certificate of Legal Practice in Laws of Malaysia.

=== New Zealand ===
The Council of Legal Education was established by section 2 of the New Zealand University Amendment Act 1930 (amending and deemed part of the New Zealand University Act 1908). There is a New Zealand Law Students Association, which has published a journal called Wagon Mound, and holds an annual national mooting competition. There is an Auckland University Law Students Society, which publishes the Auckland University Law Review, is a member of International Law Students Association, and which held the Students' Conference on Law Reform in 1965. There is a Wellington Law Students Society, an Otago Law Students Society, and a University of Canterbury Law Students Society. The original Canterbury Law Students Society was established in 1875.

=== Philippines ===
Law degree programs are considered graduate programs in the Philippines. As such, admission to law schools requires the completion of a bachelor's degree, with a sufficient number of credits or units in certain subject areas. Legal education in the Philippines is regulated and supervised by the Legal Education Board, a statutorily created independent Body chaired by a retired member of the Supreme Court or of the Court of Appeals. Its first chairman is Justice Hilarion Aquino. Sitting as members of the Board are a representative of the law professors, a representative of the law deans and a representative of the Commission on Higher Education. The membership of a student representative has been subject to continuing debate and resistance on the part of law schools. Graduation from a Philippine law school constitutes the primary eligibility requirement for the Philippine Bar Examinations, administered by the Supreme Court during the month of September every year.

In order to be eligible to take the bar examinations, one must complete either of the two professional degrees: The Bachelor of Laws (LL.B.) program or the Juris Doctor (J.D.) program. Advanced degrees are offered by some law schools, but are not requirements for admission to the practice of law in the Philippines. The degrees Master of Laws (LL.M.), Master of Legal Studies are available in only a handful of Philippine universities and colleges, among these San Beda College Graduate School of Law, the University of Santo Tomas and Ateneo de Manila University. The Doctor of Civil Law degree (DCL) is offered only by the University of Santo Tomas and the Doctor of Juridical Science (JSD) degree is offered by the San Beda College Graduate School of Law. Graduate programs in law are also regulated by the Legal Education Board.

Legal education in the Philippines normally proceeds along the following route:

- Undergraduate education (usually 4 years)
- Law school (usually 4 years)
- Admission to the bar (usually by taking a Philippine bar exam)
- Legal practice and mandatory continuing legal education

=== Russia and Ukraine ===
Law degree – jurist (often compared to an LL.M., but in fact equivalent to the degree of Specialist specific to the Soviet educational system) is awarded in Russia and Ukraine after 5 years of study at a university. Jurist degree may also be awarded in a shorter period of time if a law student has already completed Bachelor or Specialist degree in another field of studies or has previously earned a basic law degree (comparable to Paralegal, an associate degree in U.S.) from a specialized law college. Bachelor jurist degree (equivalent to Bachelor of Laws (LL.B.)) may be earned concurrently with another bachelor's or master's degree in some universities (comparable to a double-major). Note that this fused, one-degree (Specialist) educational scheme has coexisted with the two-degree (bachelor's – master's) scheme since Russia and Ukraine launched their higher education reforms to bring the domestic educational systems in closer compliance with the Bologna accords. See also academic degree. The latest educational reforms created new system where a four-year law program is offered at the universities for earning bachelor's degree, and a five-year law program is offered for master's degree. The degree of Specialist is no longer awarded and is renamed into master's degree.

=== Serbia ===
To become a lawyer in Serbia, students must graduate from an accredited faculty of law. First-level studies last four years (eight semesters), after which it is possible to enroll in Master's degree and PhD studies programmes. To become a student of the faculty of law, a candidate must pass the admission test. The practical training for students is organized at courts of law, and local and international moot court competitions. A lawyer must pass the national bar examination to become an attorney, a judge, or a prosecutor. In order to take the bar exam, it is only necessary to complete the 4 year studies programme and have a certain amount of work experience (i.e., as a paralegal), but most attorneys have also attained the master's degree in law before passing the bar exam.

=== South Africa ===
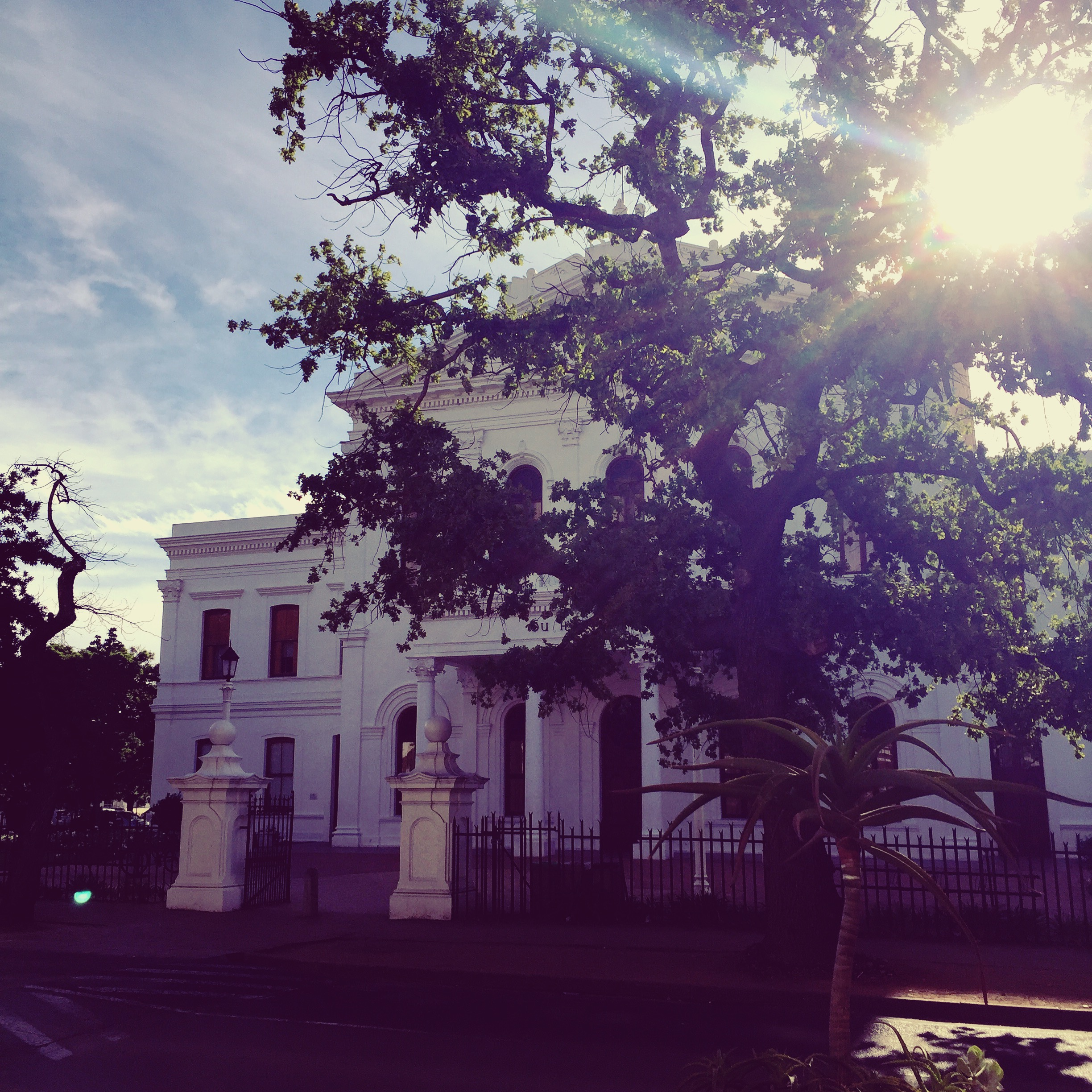
University of Stellenbosch Faculty of Law

In South Africa, the LL.B. is the universal legal qualification for admission and enrollment as an Advocate or Attorney. Since 1998, LL.B. programmes may be entered directly at the undergraduate level; at the same time, the LLB. continues to be offered postgraduate and may then be accelerated dependent on the bachelor's degree. The programme lasts between two and four years correspondingly (compare Australia, above). See Bachelor of Laws § South Africa.

Although not formally required for specialised practice, further training, e.g. in tax, is usually via postgraduate diplomas or focused, coursework-based LL.M. programmes. Research degrees are the LL.M. and LL.D., or PhD depending on university. The Master's dissertation reflects an ability to conduct independent research, whereas the Doctoral thesis will, in addition, constitute an original contribution to the field of law in question. A doctorate, generally, is required for positions in legal academia. See Master of Laws § South Africa; Doctor of Law § South Africa.

Historically, the B.Proc. and B.Juris were the legal degrees offered at the undergraduate level. The four-year BProc qualified one to practise as an attorney, or become a prosecutor or magistrate in the lower courts, but did not allow for admission as an advocate. The three-year B.Juris was the basic requirement for prosecutors and magistrates in the lower courts, but on its own, did not qualify one to practise as an attorney. Both offered admission to the LLB.

For admission as an attorney, one serves "articles" as a candidate attorney with a practising attorney for two years, and then writes a "board exam" set by the relevant provincial Law Society. See Attorneys in South Africa. The length of articles may be reduced by attending a practical legal training course or performing community service. Attorneys may additionally qualify as Notaries and Conveyancers, via the Conveyancing and Notarial Practice Examinations; those with technical or scientific training may further qualify as patent attorneys.

The requirements to enter private practice as advocates (Junior Counsel) are to become members of a Bar Association by undergoing a period of training (pupilage) for one year with a practicing Advocate, and to sit an admission examination. On the recommendation of the Bar Councils, an advocate "of proven experience and skill" with at least ten years experience, may be appointed by the President of South Africa as a Senior Counsel (SC; also referred to as a "silk"). See Advocates in South Africa.

The Act regulating admission to practise law ("The Qualifications of Legal Practitioners Amendment Act of 1997") is being revised.

=== South American countries ===
The law of South America is one of the most unified in the world. All countries can be said to follow civil law systems, although recent developments in the law of Brazil suggest a move towards the stare decisis doctrine.

=== Sri Lanka ===
In order to practice law in Sri Lanka, a lawyer must be 'admitted and enrolled as an Attorney-at-Law of the Supreme Court of the Democratic Socialist Republic of Sri Lanka. To be admitted to the bar a law student must complete law exams held by the Sri Lanka Law College and undergo a six-month period of apprenticeship under a senior practicing lawyer. There are two routes taken by students:

1. Those who have gained a law degree, an LL.B. (which is 3–4 years long in Sri Lankan State Universities of University of Colombo, University of Jaffna, Open University of Sri Lanka and University of Peradeniya) are given direct entry to undertake law exams at the Sri Lanka Law College.
2. Those who don't hold a law degree, could gain entrance to the Sri Lanka Law College via a competitive entrance exam to study law and prepare for the law exams.

Both groups of students must undergo a period of apprenticeship under a senior practicing lawyer who has at least 8 years of practicing experience. To become a judge one must be admitted as an Attorney-at-Law.

=== United Kingdom ===
In England and Wales, law can be studied as an undergraduate degree or in a Graduate Diploma in Law where students complete the Common Professional Examination. After obtaining the degree which is necessary to complete certain vocational courses and to serve a period of on the job training before one is able to qualify to practice as a barrister, legal executive, or solicitor. Bar Professional Training Course is regarded as one of the hardest degrees and presently it is the most expensive law-related degree.

=== United States ===
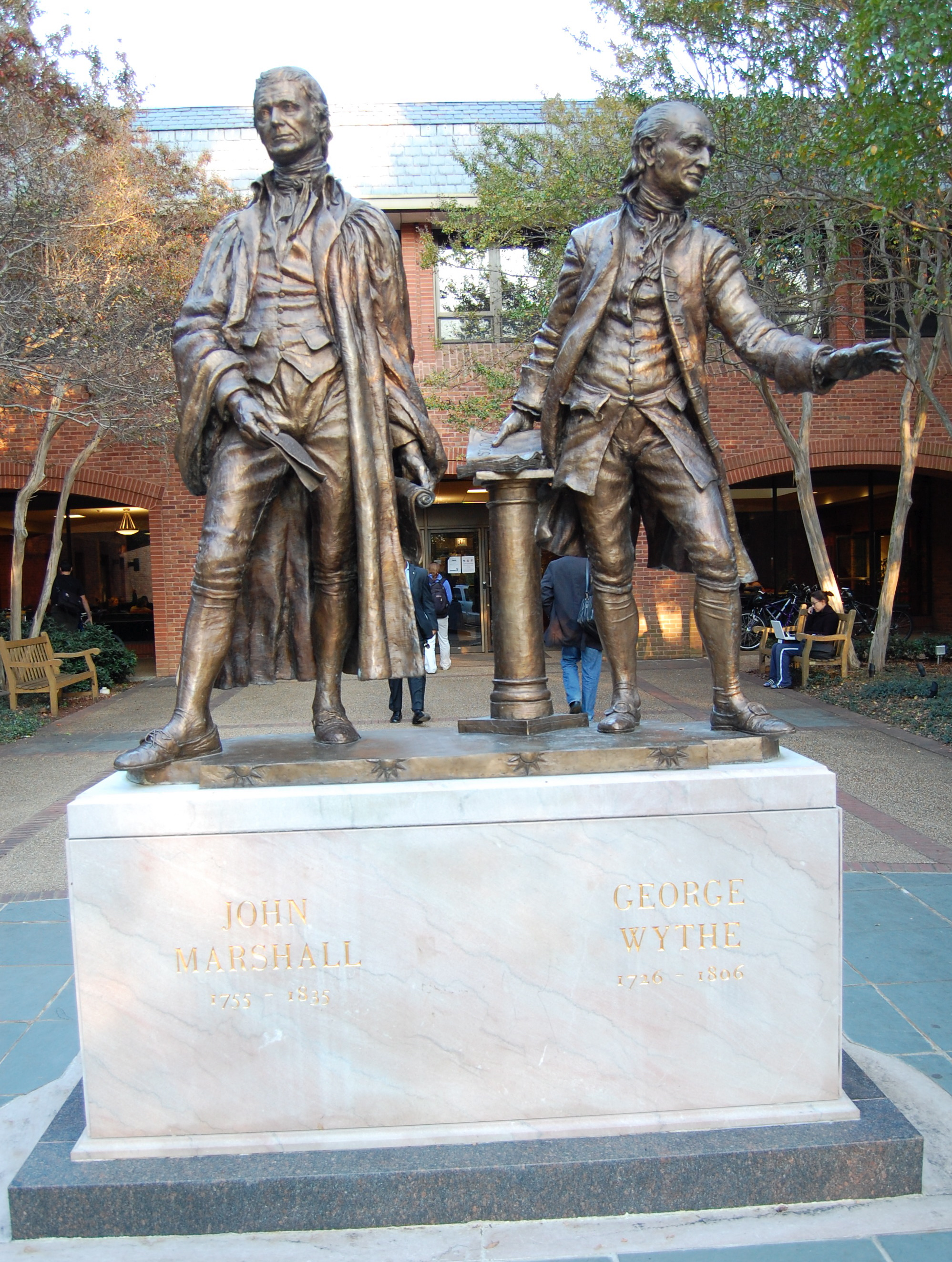
Established in 1779, William & Mary Law School is the oldest law school in the United States

The education of lawyers in the United States is generally undertaken through a law school program, although in some states (such as California and Virginia) applicants who have not attended law school may qualify to take the bar exam.

Legal education in the United States normally proceeds along the following route:

- Undergraduate education (usually 4 years)
- Law school (usually 3 years)
- Admission to the bar (usually by taking a state's bar exam)
- Legal practice

In the United States, in most cases, the degree awarded by American law schools is the Doctor of Jurisprudence or Juris Doctor (J.D.), a Doctoral degree, the pursuit of which students undertake only after having completed an undergraduate degree in some other field (usually a bachelor's degree). The law school program is considered to be a professional school program and upon graduation you receive the distinct title of Doctor (although most states strictly regulate the ability of attorneys to style themselves "doctor").

Research degrees that are awarded include the Master of Laws (LL.M.), Doctor of Juridical Science degrees (J.S.D. or S.J.D.) and Doctor of Comparative Law (D.C.L.), are post-undergraduate and research and academic-based level degrees. In the U.S. the Legum Doctor (LL.D.) is only awarded as an honorary degree.

A number of law students apply for an optional judicial clerkship (less than 10% end up in such position), to be taken after law school and before legal practice. Clerkships usually last one year with appellate courts, but trial level courts (including federal district court) are increasingly moving towards two-year clerkships.

Once a student has graduated from law school, the student is expected to pursue admission to the bar in order to practice. Requirements for membership in the bar vary across the United States. In almost every state, the only way to be admitted to the bar is to pass a (usually multi-day) written examination. Once admitted, most States require attorneys to must meet certain Continuing Legal Education (CLE) requirements.

Academic degrees for non-lawyers are available at the baccalaureate and master's level. A common baccalaureate level degree is a Bachelor of Science in Legal Studies (B.S.). Academic master's degrees in legal studies are available, such as the Master of Studies (M.S.), and the Master of Professional Studies (M.P.S.). Such a degree is not required to enter a J.D. program.

Foreign lawyers seeking to practice in the U.S., who do not have a J.D., often seek to obtain a Master of Laws (LL.M.) (or other degrees similar to the LL.M., such as the Juris Master (J.M.), Master of Comparative Law (M.C.L.) and Master of Jurisprudence (M.J.)).

Law students are commonly referred to as 1Ls, 2Ls, and 3Ls based on their year of study. In the United States, the American Bar Association does not mandate a particular curriculum for 1Ls. ABA Standard 302(a)(1) requires only the study of "substantive law" that will lead to "effective and responsible participation in the legal profession." However, most law schools have their own mandatory curriculum for 1Ls, which typically includes:

- Civil procedure (Federal Rules of Civil Procedure)
- Constitutional law (United States Constitution, especially Fifth and Fourteenth Amendments, and the Commerce Clause)
- Contracts (Article 2 (Sales) of the Uniform Commercial Code and Restatement (Second) of Contracts)
- Criminal law (General common law, Model Penal Code, and state criminal statutes)
- Property (General common law and Restatement of Property)
- Torts (General common law, Restatement (Second) and Restatement (Third) of Torts)
- Legal research (Use of a law library and computer-assisted legal research, including both LexisNexis and Westlaw)
- Legal writing (including objective analysis, persuasive analysis, and legal citation)

These basic courses are intended to provide an overview of the broad study of law. Not all ABA-approved law schools offer all of these courses in the 1L year; for example, many schools do not offer constitutional law and/or criminal law until the second and third years. Most schools also require Evidence but rarely offer the course to first-year students. Some schools combine legal research and legal writing into a single year-long "lawyering skills" course, which may also include a small oral argument component.

== See also ==
- IRAC
- Mock trial
- Moot Court
- Law degree
- Law school outlines
- Legal awareness
- Legal clinic
- List of national legal systems
- Lists of law schools
- Socratic method
- Trial advocacy
