= John R. Kramer =

American academic

- Born: August 17, 1937; New York City
- Died: March 7, 2006 (aged 68); New Orleans, Louisiana
- Citizenship: USA
- Education: Harvard University; Harvard Law School
- Scientific career
- Fields: Law
- Workplaces: Tulane University Law School, Georgetown University

John R. Kramer (August 17, 1937 – March 7, 2006) served as the 19th dean of the Tulane University Law School from 1986 to 1996, and previous to that was an associate dean at Georgetown University. At Tulane he started a law clinic to serve low-income people in New Orleans and made Tulane the first law school in the United States to require a specific number of community service hours for graduation. Under his leadership, African American students came to constitute a greater percentage of the law school student body than in any other non-historically black law school.

A cheerful and outspoken liberal, he relished controversy. He publicly defended the Tulane Environmental Law Clinic when it ran afoul of powerful chemical and oil companies in Louisiana. He also defended the Tulane Appellate Advocacy Program's involvement in a Supreme Court suit against a local utility. During his tenure, Tulane published the nation's first gay law journal. He was succeeded by Tulane Law School Dean Edward F. Sherman.

== Education and early life ==
Mr. Kramer graduated magna cum laude from Harvard University in 1958. He was a Fulbright Scholar at Cambridge University in 1958-59 and received his law degree from Harvard Law School in 1962. He clerked at the NAACP Legal Defense Fund for Thurgood Marshall, who later became the first black justice on the U.S. Supreme Court.

In 1965, he became counsel to U.S. Rep. Adam Clayton Powell Jr. (D-N.Y.) on the House Committee on Education and Labor, handling anti-poverty legislation and the first Higher Education Act. In 1987, Kramer was elected to the Common Cause National Governing Board.

Academic offices
Preceded by Paul R. Verkuil	Tulane University Law School Dean; 1986 – July 1996	Succeeded by Edward F. Sherman
