= Lawyers Military Defense Committee =

The Lawyers Military Defense Committee (LMDC) was a non-profit legal organization founded in 1970 by a group concerned that military members serving in Vietnam were unable to exercise their right to civilian counsel in courts-martial. LMDC existed for six years (1970–76) – two years in the combat zone of Vietnam, and for four years amidst disciplinary clashes inside US military forces in West Germany (with additional military cases in the Philippines and Italy). During this period high caliber civilian representation and counseling by a cohort of young attorneys were provided free of charge country-wide, in often challenging and controversial cases for hundreds of service members, including scores of trial and post-trial proceedings. Initial logistical obstacles in Vietnam were ultimately resolved satisfactorily, so that communications with clients (and prospective clients), other counsel, and the court could be accomplished pursuant to newly issued U.S. Army regulations, as were needs for access to military transport, billeting, and research facilities. In almost every instance representation by LMDC lawyers was welcomed by assigned military counsel. LMDC's operations in a war zone were unique. No undertaking of its kind has appeared in subsequent US conflicts.

== Founding ==
In early 1970, from previous experiences at Clark Air Base in the Philippines where she observed the need for independent legal counsel for U.S. overseas military personnel, donor Anne Peretz set in motion the creation of LMDC. A board of directors of noted academic and civil rights attorneys was formed, including Harvard Law School professor Charles Nesson, professor John H. Mansfield (also of Harvard), ACLU general counsel Norman Dorsen, ACLU legal director Melvin Wulf, Indiana University law professor Edward F. Sherman, and Boston civil liberties attorney William Homans. (Quaker peace activist, May Bye, subsequently joined the board with the opening of the LMDC office in West Germany.) Other supporters were former U.S. Attorney General Ramsey Clark, former U.S. Justice Department official Burke Marshall, and Dean Abraham Goldstein of the Yale Law School. The aim of the office focused on representing military clients whose cases raised issues of dissent (e.g., conscientious objection and protests against the war), racism, constitutional rights, and command influence.

== Funding ==
Funding came from charitable sources, including board member and major contributor Anne Peretz, The Rockefeller Family Fund, The Playboy Foundation, sales of lithographs and cartoons from artists Alexander Calder, Garry Trudeau, and Jules Feiffer, The Sachem Fund, several Quaker charities, Law Students Civil Rights Research Council, and direct mail appeals.

== History ==
=== Saigon office (1970–72) ===
Peter Hagerty, a navy veteran from the Harvard ROTC program, traveled to Vietnam in late summer of 1970, promoting by word of mouth the availability of LMDC legal services to GIs. Shortly thereafter, LMDC opened its doors at 203 Tu Do Street in the heart of Saigon. Initial staff members were director Henry Aronson, attorneys David Addlestone, Joseph Remcho, and office manager Susan Sherer. Attorney Dolores Donovan joined the office from March to November 1971. Later staff members (1971–72) were attorneys Howard De Nike and Edward Kopanski, and law student Susan Thorner.

=== Heidelberg office (1972–76) ===
A second LMDC office opened at Maerzgasse 7, Heidelberg, Federal Republic of Germany, in August 1972, with the arrival of Howard De Nike, who had been working with LMDC in Saigon. Attorney Robert Rivkin joined the office in October 1972. Later staff members in West Germany were attorneys Mark Schreiber (1974), William Schaap (1974–75), and Christopher Coates (1974–76), along with summer interns Gale Glazer and Louis Font (1973 and 1974), and, legal assistant Ellen Ray (1974–75). Attorney David Addlestone provided stateside support in the form of federal court litigation and fundraising throughout operation of LMDC's West German office.

=== Vietnam (1970–72) ===
Year One (1970–71): Staff – director Henry Aronson (September 1970 – November 1971), attorneys David Addlestone (November 1970 – November 1971, accompanied by wife Irene and infant son Benjamin), Joseph Remcho (December 1970 – November 1971), Dolores Donovan (March–November 1971), and office manager Susan Sherer (October 1970 – December 1971).

==== Significant cases ====
In its initial year LMDC in Vietnam faced numerous logistical obstacles. Through the efforts in Vietnam of director Aronson and office manager Sherer (assisted stateside by pressure exerted by the board of directors on the Pentagon and litigated extensively in the Vietnam court-martial U.S. v. McLemore) negotiations for office lease, access to military communication systems, military transport to courts-martial sites, and use of military legal research facilities were concluded successfully. Court-martial defense and counseling services concentrated on matters of conscientious objection (e.g., Phu Cat 3 – airmen who refused to carry weapons on guard duty and were not as required informed of conscientious objector discharge application procedures), fragging prosecutions, access by confinees at Long Binh stockade (aka "LBJ" – "Long Bình Jail") to reading materials and visitors (e.g., Reverend Hosea Williams during his 1971 Vietnam tour). LMDC defended SP4 Gussie Davis against capital charges in a racially tinged double homicide. LMDC protected efforts by U.S. Air Force and naval personnel to circulate an anti-war petition in Vietnam. LMDC, with assistance of D.C. attorney David Rein, successfully resisted attempt to give other than honorable discharge to army 2LT for display of a Moratorium Day black armband. Attorney Joseph Remcho won a not guilty verdict for a black enlisted man charged with assault on a white NCO resulting from a "dapping" (i.e., the elaborate hand-shaking often used by African-Americans) episode, in a trial where Remcho succeeded in persuading the convening authority to allow the court's members to be randomly selected.

Year Two (1971–72): Staff – Howard J. De Nike (November 1971 – August 1972) (former civilian defense counsel in the Presidio mutiny trial); Edward Kopanski (October 1971 – September 1972), and law student Susan Thorner (recruited by Prof. Charles Nesson) (October 1971 – May 1972). (From May to August 1972, De Nike worked for LMDC in the Philippines, counseling and defending U.S. naval personnel at Subic Bay, and U.S. airmen at Clark Air Force Base.)

==== Significant cases ====
December 1971, De Nike defended two soldiers (SP4 Lyver and SP4 Beller) charged with disobeying orders to provide urine samples for drug testing. (The special court-martial convictions were later overturned on reviews through the UCMJ appellate system argued by LMDC attorney David Addlestone.) Other court-martial defenses in Vietnam raised issues of racism, search and seizure, and command influence (e.g., an attempt by the air force convening authority at Cam Ranh Bay to expel a Navy judge from Vietnam following a ruling adverse to the prosecution).

=== West Germany (1972–76) ===
Year One (1972–73): Staff – Attorneys Howard De Nike (August 1972 – August 1973), Robert Rivkin (author of GI Rights and Army Justice [1970]) (October 1972 – June 1974); and law student interns (summer 1973) Louis Font and Gale Glazer (each supported by Law Students Civil Rights Research Council and donor Carol Bernstein Ferry).

==== Significant cases ====
In October 1973, Robert Rivkin defended soldiers from the 3rd Infantry Division, Schweinfurt, West Germany, who had converted to the Sikh religion, against charges of disobeying orders to shave their beards and remove their Sikh turbans. On the basis that the orders violated their religious beliefs, the defense raised objections on First Amendment and Fourth Amendment grounds. LMDC in West Germany and Washington, D.C. filed and litigated Committee for GI Rights, et al., v. Callaway, Secretary of the Army, et al., (518 F.2d 466 (1975, reversing 370 F.Supp 934 [D.D.C. 1974])), a class action challenging as unconstitutional measures invoked by the army in the name of drug suppression, including mass searches of enlisted personnel, denial of freedom of expression and movement, and confiscation of personal property without due process. Other court-martial cases involved the defense of PFC Larry Johnson who refused to report for duty in protest of U.S. support (through NATO) of the Portuguese colonial war in Mozambique (guilty verdict set aside on review); and defense of PVT (E2) Raymond Olais for refusing an order to remove a poster of Che Guevara from his living quarters (not guilty verdict at trial). LMDC attorneys in West Germany worked extensively with journalist Max Watts regarding his efforts to report on Resistance Inside the Army (RITA).

Year Two (1973–74):Staff – Robert Rivkin (1973–74), Mark Schreiber (1974), Bill Schaap (1974–75), legal assistant Ellen Ray (1974–75); law student interns (summer 1974) Louis Font and Gale Glazer (both supported by Law Students Civil Rights Research Council).

==== Significant cases ====
Attorneys Rivkin and Schaap represented eleven black sailors aboard the U.S.S. Little Rock, flagship of the Sixth Fleet, Naples, Italy, charged in an outbreak of racial assaults. As a result of a petition to the U.S. Court of Military Appeals argued by LMDC attorney David Addlestone, the convening authority, Captain Peter Cullins, was disqualified as an interested party, since he was in command of the vessel and intervened personally at the time of the fighting.

Years Three and Four (1974–76): Staff – Christopher Coates, Heidelberg and Berlin (November 1974 – June 1976).

==== Significant cases ====
Berlin Haircut Trials– November 1974, LMDC represented a group of Berlin GIs charged with failing to have haircuts meeting military regulations. The cases resulted in widespread publicity and a brief soldiers' strike exposing Army efforts to enforce increased discipline. African-American enlisted person Babbette Peyton was defended at court-martial after she was denied the right to wear her hair in cornrows. In United States v. Hatheway, LMDC urged denial of equal protection in the prosecution of the accused for engaging in homosexual acts on the basis of selective prosecution and a narrowed constitutional test where rights of a minority are at stake.

== Army spying on LMDC ==
In the summer of 1973, Army Intelligence branch member SP4 Michael McDougal contacted LMDC with information that its Heidelberg office was the target of Army spying. This disclosure (together with others revealing extensive military surveillance of lawful activities of American civilians in Germany using wire taps, mail covers, infiltration, and dirty tricks) led to scandals described in major American and German media. As a consequence of the Army's activities, LMDC and other civilians affected filed a federal lawsuit for damages; settled ultimately in favor of the plaintiffs. LMDC and the other plaintiffs were represented by Washington, D.C., ACLU national staff counsels Mark Lynch and John Shattuck.
