= Sweet & Maxwell =

British publisher specialising in legal publications

- Parent company: Thomson Reuters
- Founded: As Stephen Sweet 1799 as Alexander Maxwell 1800 as Sweet & Maxwell 1802
- Country of origin: United Kingdom
- Headquarters location: London; Mytholmroyd; Edinburgh
- Nonfiction topics: Law
- No. of employees: Approx. 1000
- Official website: www.sweetandmaxwell.co.uk

Sweet & Maxwell is a British publisher specialising in legal publications. It joined the Associated Book Publishers in 1969; ABP was purchased by the International Thomson Organization in 1987, and is now part of Thomson Reuters. Its British and Irish group includes W. Green in Scotland and Round Hall in Ireland.

Sweet & Maxwell publishes Westlaw-UK, as well as the Lawtel, LocalawUK, Legal Hub, and DocDel on-line services. It also published many well-regarded looseleafs and books. Its flagship print products include the White Book (publishing the Civil Procedure Rules 1998, along with extensive commentary and additional material) and Archbold Criminal Pleading, Evidence and Practice (the leading practitioners' text for criminal lawyers in England & Wales and several other common law jurisdictions around the world). In 2003, its Asia division (with headquarters in Hong Kong, Malaysia, and Singapore) won the contract to supply law books to the Hong Kong government. Sweet & Maxwell is part of the European law publishers initiative Law Publishers in Europe.

== See also ==
- European Competition Law Review
- Incomes Data Services
- Jowitt's Dictionary of English Law
- Scots Law Times
