= James Allan (law professor) =

Canadian law professor

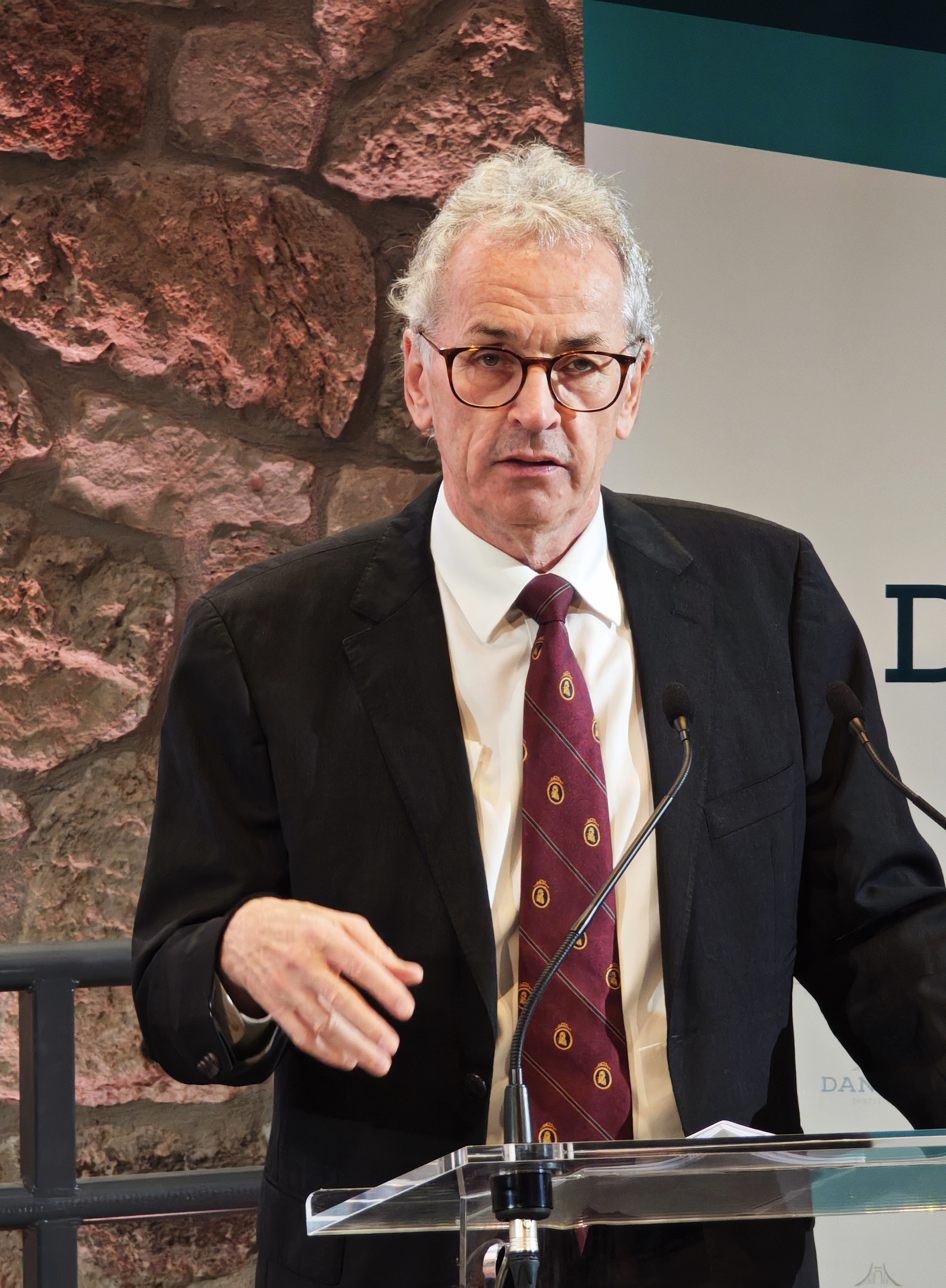
In 2026

James Allan (born 1960) is a Canadian-Australian law professor and writer. He is the Garrick Professor of Law at the University of Queensland.

Allan has degrees from Queen's University, the London School of Economics and the University of Hong Kong. He qualified as a barrister and solicitor with The Law Society of Ontario in 1988. Prior to his appointment at the University of Queensland, Allan taught at the University of Otago.

As a legal scholar, Allan is well-known for his opposition to bills of rights.

Allan writes opinion pieces in The Australian newspaper. He is author of Democracy in Decline: Steps in the Wrong Direction, occasional contributor to Quadrant magazine and The Spectator and editor of the University of Queensland Law Journal. As a columnist for The Spectator Australia, he has supported the view that Joe Biden’s victory in the 2020 US presidential election was marked by voting irregularities; that the election was potentially flawed because of extensive mail-in voting and a lack of ballot security. Allan has spoken at CPAC. During the constitutional debate regarding an indigenous "voice" to Parliament, Allan observed that Indigenous Australians are, on a per-capita basis, already overrepresented in the Parliament of Australia. In the context of a free speech discussion, Allan observed "Kanye [an African American] is a brave man. He and his girlfriend were wearing shirts that say white lives matter, and he's taken a bit of heat for that."
