= European Competition Law Review =

Monthly journal of international competition law

The European Competition Law Review (ECLR) is a monthly journal published by Sweet & Maxwell and dedicated to international competition law. The publication is in English.

== See also ==
- List of law journals
