= Banaras Law Journal =

Indian legal journal

- Discipline: Law
- Language: English
- Edited by: Dean, Faculty of Law, Banaras Hindu University

Publication details
- History: 1965–present
- Publisher: Banaras Hindu University Press (India)
- Frequency: Biannual
- Open access: Yes

Standard abbreviations
- Bluebook: Ban.L.J.
- ISO 4: Banaras Law J.

Indexing
- ISSN: 0522-0815
- LCCN: sa68004336
- OCLC no.: 2528789

Links
- Journal homepage; Online Access

The Banaras Law Journal is a legal journal published by the Banaras Hindu University Press on behalf of Faculty of Law, Banaras Hindu University. It was established in 1965, when no other Indian university was publishing such a journal.

== History ==
The journal was established in 1965 by Natwarlal H. Bhagwati, 10th vice-chancellor of Banaras Hindu University and former judge at the Supreme Court of India.

== Reception ==
Following publication of the first issue, a 1966 review in the International and Comparative Law Quarterly welcomed its appearance as "a matter of great pleasure" which was "long overdue". A review in the Journal of the Indian Law Institute said that Banaras Law Journal had made a "promising beginning", stating, "A very interesting feature of the first issue lies in the publication of L.L.M. and Ph.D. work being carried out at the University; it would be very valuable if other Indian universities provided similar information."

By 1987, an article in the Modern Law Review observed that most well known law faculties in India were trying to start their own law journals, while noting that "The Banaras Law Journal and Jaipur Law Journal have suffered some decline after an impressive head start." In 2010, an article on legal education in India published in the BYU Education & Law Journal listed Banaras Law Journal as one of the prominent national law journals, along with the Jaipur Law Journal and the Delhi Law Review.

== See also ==
- List of law journals
