= Michigan State University College of Law =

Public law school in East Lansing, Michigan, US

Coordinates: 42°43′32.6″N 84°28′24.2″W

- Parent school: Michigan State University
- Established: 1891; 135 years ago
- School type: Public law school
- Parent endowment: $4.4 billion (2021)
- Dean: Michael Sant’Ambrogio
- Location: East Lansing, Michigan, United States
- Enrollment: 784
- Faculty: 51 full time, 73 part time
- USNWR ranking: 115th (tie) (2025)
- Bar pass rate: 77.46% (2022 first-time takers)
- Website: law.msu.edu
- ABA profile: Standard 509 Report

The Michigan State University College of Law (Michigan State Law or MSU Law) is the law school of Michigan State University, a public research university in East Lansing, Michigan. Established in 1891 as the Detroit College of Law, it was the first law school in the Detroit, Michigan, area and the second in the state of Michigan. In October 2018, the college began a process to fully integrate into Michigan State University, changing from a private to a public law school. The integration with Michigan State University was finalized on August 17, 2020.

For the class entering in 2023, the school had a 39.37% acceptance rate, 35.37% of those accepted enrolled, and entering students had a median LSAT score of 159 and a median undergraduate GPA of 3.55.

For the 2023 graduating class, 69.59% of graduates obtained full-time, long-term bar-passage-required employment (i.e., employment as attorneys), and 13.92% were not employed part- or full-time in any capacity, within 10 months after graduation.

== History ==
=== Detroit College of Law ===
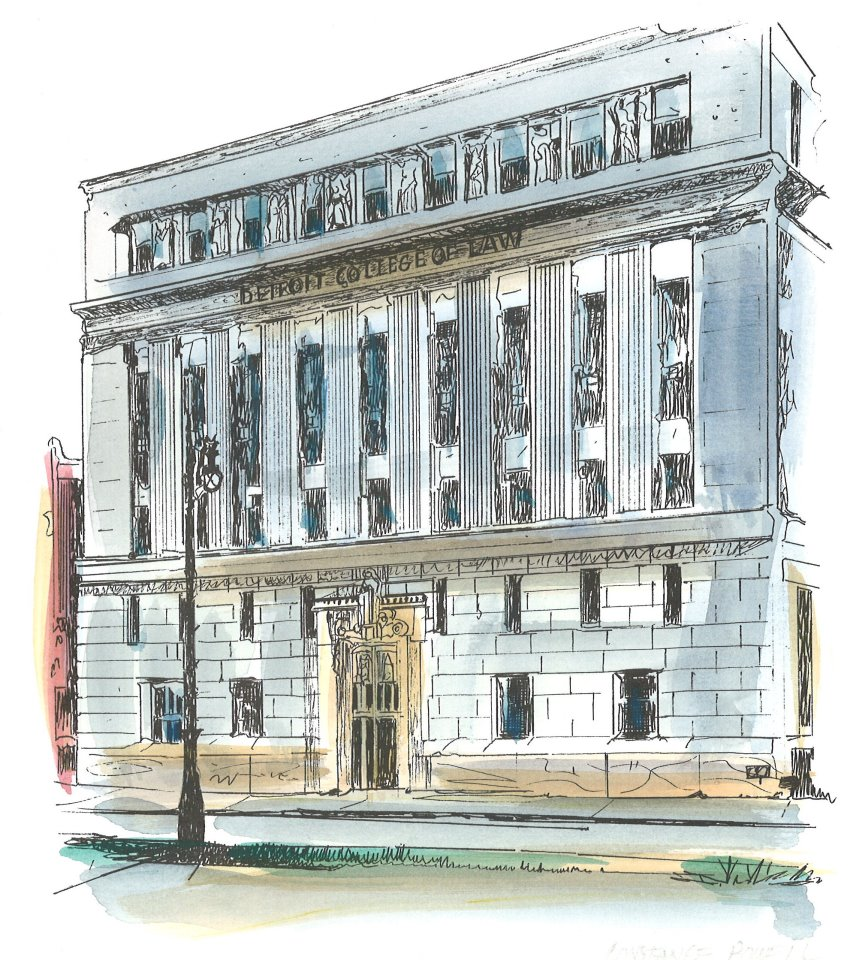
Etching of Detroit College of Law, Elizabeth Street Building, Detroit 1937–1997

Detroit College of Law opened in 1891 with 69 students and was incorporated in 1893. Among the first class of students to graduate were a future circuit judge and an ambassador. It was the oldest continuously operating independent law school in the United States until it was assimilated by MSU in 1995. The college was affiliated with the Detroit Young Men's Christian Association (YMCA). (Note: It was interrelated with the Detroit Institute of Technology.)

In 1937, the school broke ground and relocated to a new building at 130 East Elizabeth Street in Detroit, where it stayed until 1997. The Building was designed by architect George DeWitt Mason. It had been located at the former Detroit College of Medicine building on St. Antoine Street from 1892 to 1913; and the Detroit "YMCA" building from 1913 to 1924; the ground on which the building stood was under a 99-year lease from the YMCA. The last location of the Detroit College of Law in Downtown Detroit is commemorated by a plaque at Comerica Park, the home stadium of the Detroit Tigers baseball team, which now occupies the site.

=== Affiliation with Michigan State University ===
The college became affiliated with Michigan State University in 1995. It relocated to East Lansing in 1997, when its 99-year lease with the Detroit YMCA expired, and the original building was demolished to make way for Comerica Park. The newly located college was called "Detroit College of Law at Michigan State University". In April 2004, the school changed its name to the MSU College of Law, becoming more closely aligned academically with MSU. MSU Law is currently fully integrated as a constituent college of the university: academically, financially, and structurally.

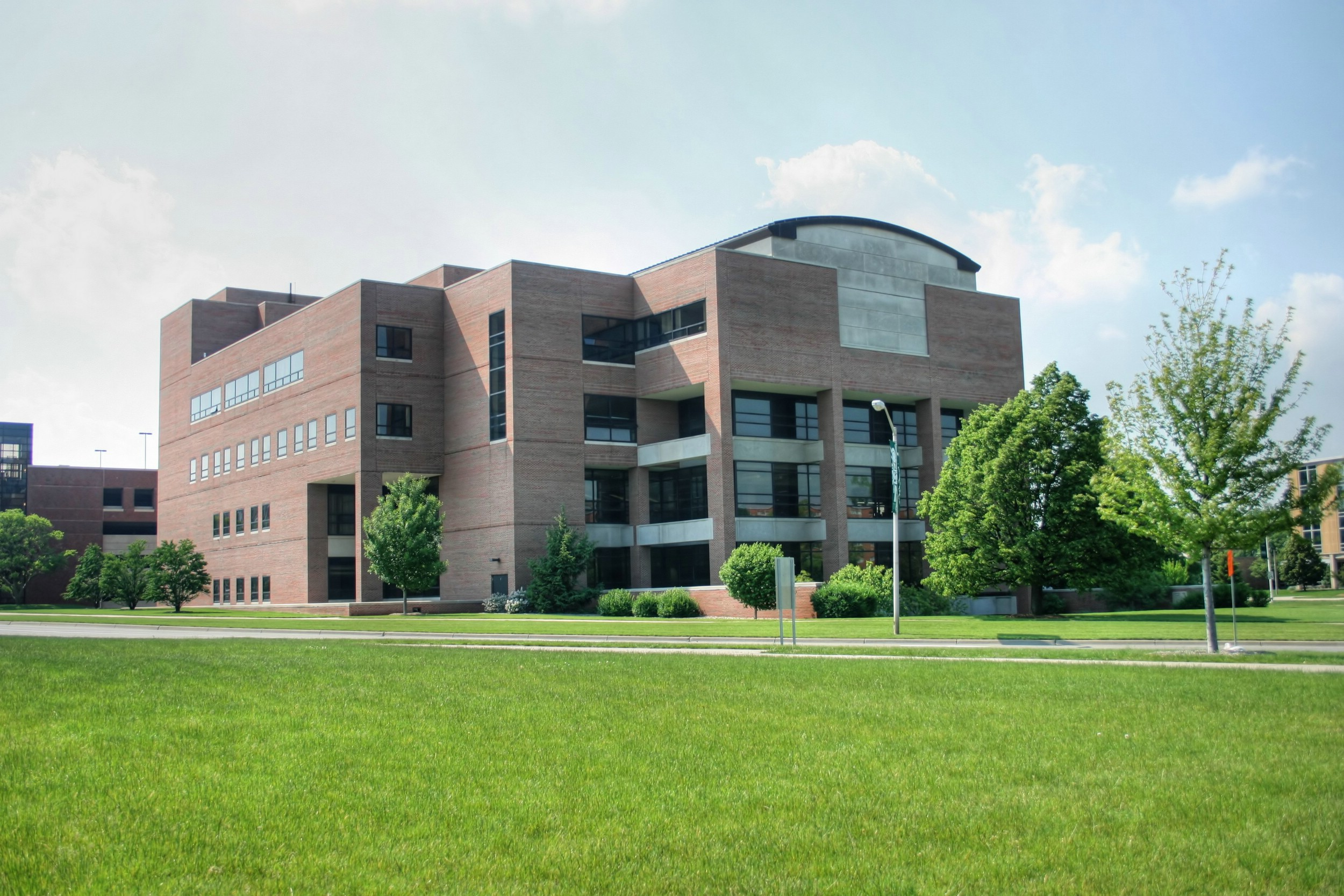
MSU Law building from the southeast

Joan Howarth began her deanship at Michigan State University College of Law on July 1, 2008 and was the first female dean in MSU Law's 117-year history. Beforehand, she was a professor at the William S. Boyd School of Law at the University of Nevada, Las Vegas, since 2001. She retired at the end of the 2015-16 school year. Lawrence Ponoroff became the Dean in the fall of 2016, and he served in that role until the end of December 2019. On October 26, 2018, MSU's board of directors voted to fully integrate the College of Law into the university, thereby completing its transition from a private, independent institution to a public law school. The full integration was undertaken in order to facilitate collaboration between the law school and other divisions of MSU.

Melanie B. Jacobs, professor of law, was then appointed as the law college's interim dean, beginning in January 2020 and under her tenure, the integration of the College of Law into the university was completed on August 17, 2020. On June 1, 2021, Linda Sheryl Greene became Dean and MSU Foundation Professor of Law, and was the Inaugural Dean of the College of Law. Dean Greene (a leading scholar in sports law) was previously the Evjue-Bascom Professor of Law at the University of Wisconsin-Madison. Dean Greene stepped down as dean in January 2024, since which time Michael Sant'Ambrogio has served as interim dean.

== Admissions ==
For the class entering in 2023, MSU Law accepted 39.37% of applicants, with 35.37% of those accepted enrolling. The average enrollee had a 159 LSAT score and 3.55 undergraduate GPA.

== Academic programs ==
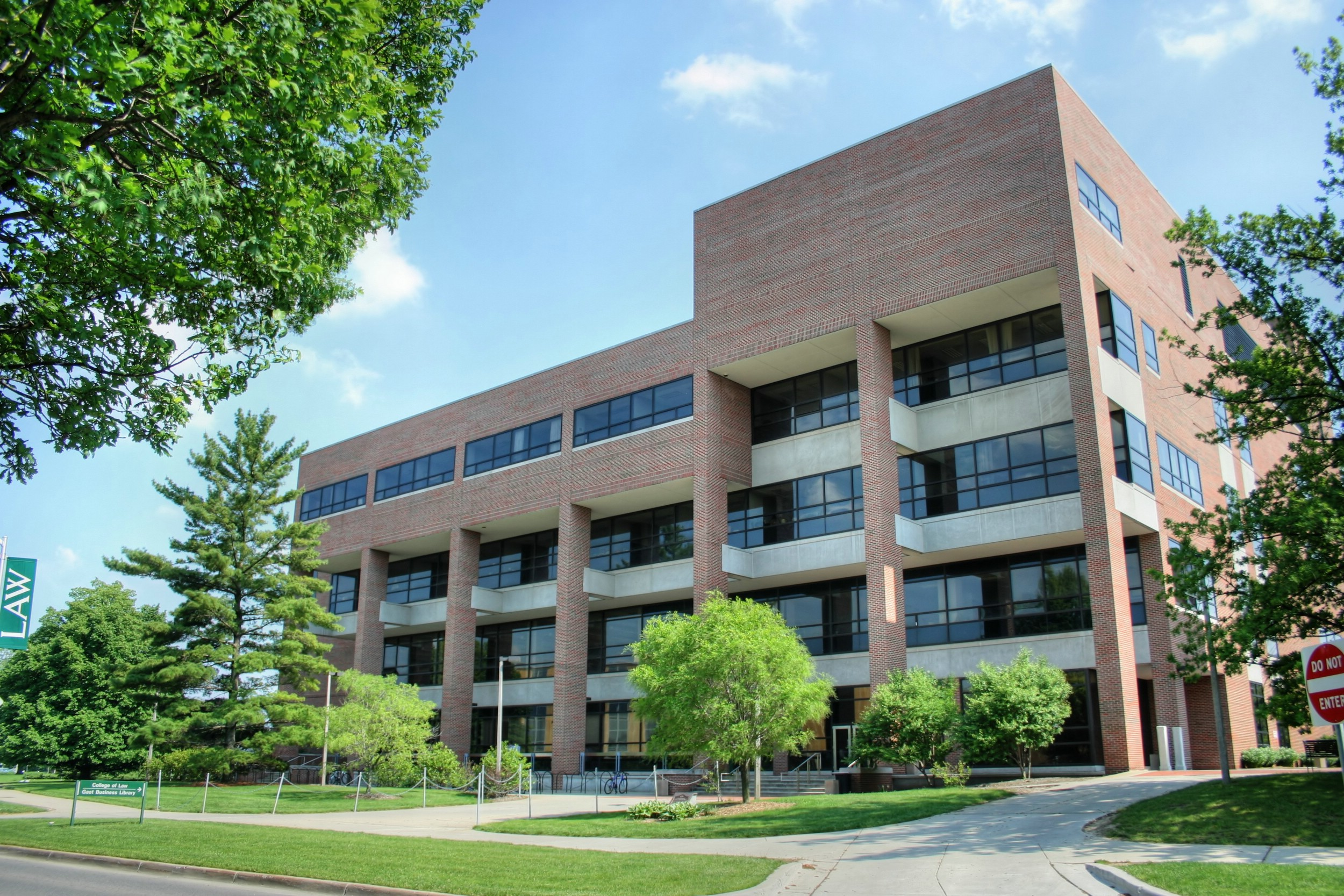
MSU Law building from the north

MSU Law also houses the Center for Law, Technology & Innovation (CLTI), formerly named the ReInvent Law Program, and LegalRnD; the Indigenous Law & Policy Center (ILPC); the Geoffrey N. Fieger Trial Practice Institute (TPI); and The Indigenous Law Program.

== Academic journals and publications ==
Law journals at the law school are nationally ranked and include:

- Michigan State Law Review, the school's flagship journal, ranked 99th among American law school journals with a score of 14.55 out of 100 as ranked by Washington and Lee University School of Law in 2022.
- Michigan State International Law Review
- Animal and Natural Resource Law Review

Additionally, the school also publishes Spartan Lawyer, the law college's bi-annual magazine. Formerly, the school published the Journal of Business & Securities Law.

== Bar examination passage ==
In 2022, the overall bar examination passage rate for the law school’s first-time examination takers was 77.46%. The Ultimate Bar Pass Rate, which the ABA defines as the passage rate for graduates who sat for bar examinations within two years of graduating, was 88.26% for the class of 2020.

== Employment ==
For the 2023 graduating class, 69.59% of graduates obtained full-time, long-term bar-passage-required employment (i.e., employment as attorneys), and 8.76% were employed in full-time JD advantage positions, within 10 months after graduation. Attorney positions were in various size law firms, most being in 1-10 attorney firms, 5.15% of graduates obtained local or state judicial clerkships, 1.55% obtained a federal clerkship, 27.84% of members of the class were otherwise employed in public interest, government, higher education, or business, and 13.92% were not employed part- or full-time in any capacity, within 10 months after graduation.

== Notable faculty ==
=== Current ===
- Rosemarie Aquilina, adjunct professor, circuit court judge in Michigan who sentenced Larry Nassar in the USA Gymnastics sex abuse scandal involving Michigan State.
- Brian C. Kalt, legal scholar and writer who is known for his research of the constitution, the presidency, and juries.
- Jim Chen, one of four Asian-Americans who has been a dean at an American law school (University of Louisville School of Law).
- Robert P. Young Jr., adjunct professor, former Justice of the Michigan Supreme Court.

=== Former ===
- Elizabeth Price Foley, legal theorist and current Professor of Law at Florida International University College of Law.
- Donald Laverdure, former director of the American Indian Law Program at MSU Law and oversaw the Bureau of Indian Affairs and Bureau of Indian Education under the presidency of Barack Obama.
- David McKeague, Senior United States Circuit Judge of the United States Court of Appeals for the Sixth Circuit.
- Richard D. McLellan, Chairman of the Michigan Law Revision Commission and private practice attorney.
- Stacy Erwin Oakes, member of the Michigan House of Representatives and Minority Whip representing Michigan's 95th District.
- Lawrence Ponoroff, former Dean of James E. Rogers College of Law, Tulane Law School, and MSU Law.
- Mark Totten, former United States attorney for the Western District of Michigan.
- Bradford Stone, commercial law maven and theorist, Stetson University College of Law Charles A. Dana Professor of Law Emeritus, author of several editions of Uniform Commercial Code in a Nutshell and coauthor of Commercial Transactions Under the Uniform Commercial Code. The college’s Bradford Stone Faculty chair is named in his honor.
- Melissa L. Tatum, research professor and former director of the Indigenous Peoples Law and Policy Program at James E. Rogers College of Law.

== Notable alumni ==
=== Judges ===
- Dennis Archer, former Justice of the Michigan Supreme Court and former mayor of Detroit, Michigan
- Elizabeth T. Clement, Justice of the Michigan Supreme Court since 2017, and current chief justice
- George Crockett III, Judge of the Recorder's Court (Detroit) (renamed the Wayne County Circuit Court) from 1977 to 2003
- Former Justice Alton Thomas Davis, Michigan Supreme Court, 2010 appointed by Jennifer M. Granholm
- George Clifton Edwards Jr. (deceased), former Judge of the United States Court of Appeals for the Sixth Circuit
- Bernard A. Friedman, Senior status Judge of the United States District Court for the Eastern District of Michigan
- Diane Marie Hathaway, former Justice of the Michigan Supreme Court
- Ira W. Jayne (deceased), former chief judge, Wayne County Circuit Court for 27 years
- Richard Fred Suhrheinrich, Senior status Judge of the United States Court of Appeals for the Sixth Circuit

=== Politicians ===
- Mike Bishop, Michigan Senate majority leader from 2002 to 2010 and U.S. Representative for Michigan's 8th congressional district from 2015 to 2018
- Christopher D. Dingell, state senator and judge
- Geoffrey Fieger, attorney and former Michigan gubernatorial candidate
- Orville L. Hubbard, former mayor of Dearborn, Michigan
- Kwame Kilpatrick, former mayor of Detroit, Michigan
- Mark Meadows, former mayor of East Lansing a former member of the Michigan House of Representatives
- Steve Pestka, former member of the Michigan House of Representatives, judge, and a Kent County, Michigan commissioner
- Brian Sims, Democratic representative for the Pennsylvania House of Representatives, 182nd District
- Gretchen Whitmer, 49th Governor of Michigan

=== Public figures ===
- Ivan Boesky, former American stock trader infamous for his prominent role in an insider trading scandal that occurred in the United States during the mid-1980s resulting in his conviction including a record $100 million fine.; Attended, but did not graduate.
- Ella Bully-Cummings, chief of police of Detroit, Michigan, from 2003 to 2008
- John Z. DeLorean, automobile engineer and executive; attended, but did not graduate
- Lowell W. Perry, former government official, businessman, broadcaster, and the first African-American assistant coach in the National Football League
- W. Clement Stone, businessman, philanthropist and New Thought self-help book author; did not graduate
