= David Levi-Faur =

Israeli political scientist and academic (born 1961)

- דייוויד לוי-פאור
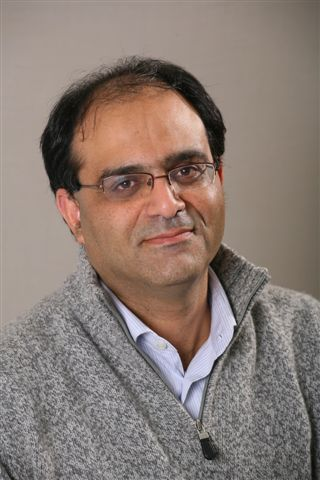
- Born: May 6, 1961 (age 65)

Academic background
- Education: Open University (B.A. 1984); University of Haifa (Ph.D. 1992)

Academic work
- Discipline: Political Economy, Public Policy, Regulation and Governance
- Institutions: Hebrew University of Jerusalem

David Levi-Faur (Hebrew: דייוויד לוי-פאור; born in Haifa, Israel) is an Israeli political scientist and academic who specializes in comparative political economy and public policy, regulation and governance. He is currently affiliated with the Hebrew University of Jerusalem. He is the author of more than 70 academic papers.

Levi-Faur is one of the main authorities on regulation in the social sciences. He was co-founder of the ECPR Standing Group on Regulation and Governance. Together with John Braithwaite and Cary Coglianese, Levi-Faur is a founding editor of the Regulation & Governance journal.

Together with Avishai Benish he edits the Working Papers series Jerusalem Papers in Regulation & Governance

== Books ==
Levi-Faur edited the Handbook on the Politics of Regulation, The Oxford Handbook of Governance and together with Jacint Jordana, The Rise of Regulatory Capitalism; The Global Diffusion of a New Order and The Politics of Regulation.

== Media ==
He is the founder of the Israeli Social Sciences Network and the Political Science email Network.

== Academic Leadership ==
Levi-Faur founded the TELEM program at the Hebrew University of Jerusalem, a combined MA/PhD program designed to support exceptional political science students throughout their graduate study.
