= The Regulatory Review =

- Available in: English
- Owners: Penn Program on Regulation, University of Pennsylvania Law School
- Creator: Cary Coglianese
- Editor: Bryn Hines
- Website: www.theregreview.org
- Commercial: No
- Launched: December 24, 2009; 16 years ago

The Regulatory Review is an online, daily publication devoted to coverage of regulatory news, analysis, and commentary. It is produced under the auspices of the Penn Program on Regulation and operated by students at the University of Pennsylvania Law School. The Regulatory Review's content includes essays produced by the publication's staff members as well as regular contributions from scholars, public officials, attorneys, and others interested in regulatory developments.

== History ==
The Regulatory Review dates to 2009, when it was originally known as RegBlog. At that time, University of Pennsylvania Law School Professor Cary Coglianese placed a blogging component on the website of the Penn Program on Regulation (PPR). Coglianese named the blog "RegBlog"—a name intended to convey the blog's purpose as a platform devoted to coverage of regulation. The blog's content initially comprised occasional short posts about regulatory news items and other related developments.

Content was added to the site on an intermittent basis, until then-Penn Law student Jonathan Mincer presented a plan to create a student-run infrastructure based around the regular production of content. After that student-run organization became active, a new website was constructed for RegBlog that no longer relied on the stock blog functionality that had been built into the initial PPR website. RegBlog's new site was launched in April 2011, which marked the beginning of RegBlog as a publication in a form similar to what The Regulatory Review is today, featuring new content every weekday of the year.

A subsequent redesign of the RegBlog website was carried out in November 2013, an undertaking that involved placing RegBlog onto a new platform and giving it the graphical look that it retained until another redesign in March 2017.

This most recent redesign was part of a larger initiative by the members of RegBlog's 2016–2017 Editorial Board under the leadership of former editor-in-chief Kim Kirschenbaum. This initiative also included changing the publication's name in March 2017 from RegBlog to The Regulatory Review.

== Content ==
The Regulatory Review features coverage on regulatory topics, including administrative law, environmental regulation, financial regulation, health care, network neutrality, occupational safety and health, regulatory politics, telecommunications, and transportation, among other issues. It also features long-form essays written by contributors who occupy positions in government, academia, the nonprofit sector, and the private sector. In addition to publishing essays contributed by regulatory experts, The Regulatory Review features content authored by student staff members.

The Regulatory Review also periodically publishes "series," collections of essays organized around common themes or topics. Examples of notable series include "Regulating Police Use of Force," "Artificial Intelligence and the Administrative State," "A Debate over the Use of Cost-Benefit Analysis," "Rooting Out Regulatory Capture," "Bringing Expertise to the Gun Debate," "Comparing Nations’ Responses to COVID-19," "Racism, Regulation, and the Administrative State," and "Regulation in the Era of FinTech."

== Recent leadership ==
Year	Board	Editor-in-Chief	Managing Editor
2024	15th	Sri Medicherla	Tyler Hoguet
2023	14th	Bryn Hines	Jackson Nichols
2022	13th	Soojin Jeong	Margaret Sturtevant
2021	12th	Jocelyn A.K. Walcott	Richard DiNapoli
2020	10th	Larissa Morgan	Lynn McDonough
2019	9th	Simone Hussussian	Marissa Fritz
2018	8th	Sarah Madigan	Nicholas Bellos
2017	7th	Charlie Rosenthal	Bryan C. Williamson
2016	6th	Kim Kirschenbaum	Eric Schlabs
2015	5th	Alexandra Hamilton	Kate Sell
2014	4th	Jessica Bassett	Brandon Kenney Natalie Punchak
2013	3rd	James Hobbs	Lauren-Kelly Devine
2012	2nd	Sean Moloney	Brian Ryoo
2011	1st	Jonathan Mincer	Sean Moloney

Professor Coglianese is the publication's faculty advisor.

== Notable contributors ==
- Anita L. Allen, Professor, University of Pennsylvania Law School
- Tom Baker, Professor, University of Pennsylvania Law School & leading scholar of insurance law
- Erwin Chemerinsky, Founding Dean, University of California, Irvine School of Law & nationally renowned constitutional law scholar
- Mariano-Florentino Cuéllar, Associate Justice, California Supreme Court
- Susan Dudley, Director, George Washington University Regulatory Studies Center & former Administrator, White House Office of Information and Regulatory Affairs
- Mickey Edwards, former U.S. Representative (R-Okla.)
- Jason Furman, former Chairman of the White House Council of Economic Advisers
- Heather Gerken, Dean, Yale Law School
- John Graham, Dean, Indiana University School of Public and Environmental Affairs & former Administrator, White House Office of Information and Regulatory Affairs
- Edward R. Hamberger, President and CEO, Association of American Railroads
- Richard Hasen, Professor, University of California, Irvine & leading expert in election law
- Orrin Hatch, U.S. Senator (R-Utah)
- Sally Katzen, Professor, New York University School of Law & former Administrator, White House Office of Information and Regulatory Affairs
- Robert A. Katzmann, U.S. Circuit Court Judge, U.S. Court of Appeals for the Second Circuit
- W. Kip Viscusi, Professor, Vanderbilt University Law School
- Mike Lee, U.S. Senator (R-Utah)
- Tracey Meares, Professor, Yale Law School
- Geoffrey Parsons Miller, Professor, New York University School of Law
- Joseph Mohorovic, Commissioner, U.S. Consumer Product Safety Commission
- Nancy Nord, former Commissioner, U.S. Consumer Product Safety Commission
- Anne Northup, former U.S. Representative (R-Ky.) & former Commissioner, U.S. Consumer Product Safety Commission
- Jed Rakoff, U.S. District Court Judge, Southern District of New York
- Richard L. Revesz, Director, American Law Institute & Professor and Dean Emeritus, New York University School of Law
- Paul Robinson, Professor, University of Pennsylvania Law School
- Theodore Ruger, Dean, University of Pennsylvania Law School
- Cass Sunstein, Professor, Harvard Law School & former Administrator, White House Office of Information and Regulatory Affairs
- Paul R. Verkuil, Professor, Benjamin N. Cardozo School of Law & former Chairman, Administrative Conference of the United States
- Elizabeth Warren, U.S. Senator (D-Mass.)
- Sheldon Whitehouse, U.S. Senator (D-R.I.)
- Cecil Thomas, Ohio State Senator
