= Canadian Journal of Family Law =

- Discipline: Family law
- Language: English, French
- Edited by: Erez Aloni; Régine Tremblay; Hugh Dauvergne; Kirthana Singh Khurana

Publication details
- History: 1978
- Publisher: Peter A. Allard School of Law, University of British Columbia (Canada)
- Frequency: Biannual
- Open access: yes

Standard abbreviations
- ISO 4: Can. J. Fam. Law

Indexing
- ISSN: 0704-1225
- OCLC no.: 60621360

Canadian Journal of Family Law is the first interdisciplinary academic journal in Canada to publish articles on a wide variety of family law issues. It is national in its scope, publishing articles in both English and French on topics in either common law or civil law. The Journal also publishes papers originally presented at regional conferences on family law.

== Family Law in Canada and Beyond: Changing Perspectives ==
Family law is a constantly changing area of law. Shifts in societal values and changes in public policy are reflected in judicial decisions and legislative amendments in the family law arena. Contributors to the Journal have commented upon issues such as same-sex domestic partnerships, the relevance of race to child custody, the impact of domestic violence on child access, equality rights in adoption reform, and how father's rights relate to child support.

== History ==
The Canadian Journal of Family Law was established at Osgoode Hall Law School of York University following a conversation in 1976 between Professor Graham Parker and a second-year law student, Gene C. Colman. The two were concerned by the lack of an interdisciplinarian Canadian journal in the field, and encouraged the university to seize the opportunity to publish in family law.

In 1978, the first volume of the journal was published by York University’s Osgoode Hall Law School with the support of Professor Howard Irving, but it eventually moved to law offices where it was edited by Gene C. Colman. In 1982, the Journal moved to the University of British Columbia Faculty of Law.

== Management of the Journal ==
The Journal is run by students from the University of British Columbia Faculty of Law. Students participate in all aspects of this endeavor on both the editorial and business side of the Journal.

Although originally supervised by faculty, the goal was to have the Journal become a student-run publication. In the early years, Professor MacDougall dedicated himself to the Journal's sustainability, with student editors gradually assuming an increased percentage of the work associated with the operation of the Canadian Journal of Family Law.

== Alan Falconer Memorial Student Essay Competition ==
In 1993, the Journal created an essay competition in the name of a former student editor. Each year, law students across Canada compete to have their submissions published in the Journal. The winning author also receives a monetary award.
