= Macquarie Law Journal =

- Discipline: Law
- Language: English

Publication details
- History: 2001-present
- Publisher: Division of Law, Macquarie University (Australia)
- Frequency: Annually

Standard abbreviations
- ISO 4: Macquarie Law J.

Indexing
- ISSN: 1445-386X

Links
- Journal homepage

The Macquarie Law Journal is an annual peer-reviewed law review published by the Division of Law at Macquarie University. It is published online and in hard copy.

Among the journal’s early contributors was Michael Kirby, an Australian jurist and academic who served as a Justice of the High Court of Australia.
