= American Bankruptcy Law Journal =

- Discipline: American law
- Language: English

Publication details
- History: 1993; 1996-2011; 2014-present
- Publisher: National Conference of Bankruptcy Judges
- Frequency: Quarterly

Standard abbreviations
- Bluebook: Am. Bankr. L.J.
- ISO 4: Am. Bankruptcy Law J.

Indexing
- ISSN: 0027-9048

Links
- Journal homepage

The American Bankruptcy Law Journal is a peer-reviewed law review focusing on bankruptcy issues. It is published by the National Conference of Bankruptcy Judges.
