= James Cook University Law Review =

The James Cook University Law Review is an annual peer-reviewed law journal published by the James Cook University School of Law.
