= Revue générale de droit =

Law journal

Revue générale de droit is a law journal published by the University of Ottawa Faculty of Law. It was established in 1970, and publishes articles in French and English about Canadian law twice a year.
