= National Property Law Digests =

The National Property Law Digests are annual volumes published by Strafford since 1961 that cover all significant court decisions in the fields of real property and property transactions. It consists of twelve volumes published annually. The digests are frequently cited in appellate court opinions in the United States and Canada.

== See also ==
- Strafford, Dallas, Texas
