= International Association of Labour Law Journals =

The International Association of Labour Law Journals is a learned society that aims to promote the international study and exchange of labour law publications. It consists of twenty-one law reviews published in countries across the world. The current president is Steven L. Willborn (University of Nebraska College of Law).

== Purpose ==
The association seeks to fulfil three principal goals: (1) Further academic achievement in the areas of labour and employment law; (2) Foster sharing of information relevant to the publishing process; and (3) Create greater connections between the editors-in-chief of national and international labour and employment law journals.

== Marco Biagi Award ==
The late Italian jurist Marco Biagi was instrumental in forming the Association, originally called the Club of Labour Law Journals, and served as its first president. Biagi was assassinated in 2002 by the Red Brigades-PCC. In his honour, the Association Awards the Marco Biagi Award each year for the best paper on comparative or international labour law by a young scholar.
