= Global Jurist =

- Discipline: Law
- Language: English
- Edited by: Ugo Mattei, Alberto Monti

Publication details
- History: Since 2001
- Publisher: Walter de Gruyter
- Frequency: Quarterly

Standard abbreviations
- ISO 4: Glob. Jurist

Indexing
- ISSN: 1934-2640

Links
- Journal homepage

Global Jurist is a peer-reviewed law review of legal scholarship. It focuses on comparative law, international law, law and economics, law and development, and legal anthropology. Its first issue was published in November 2001. Global Jurist favors a critical non-ethnocentric approach. It publishes articles in English, Spanish, and French.
