= Regulation & Governance =

- Discipline: Political science, public administration, social science
- Language: English
- Edited by: Graeme Auld, Ning Liu, Alketa Peci and Yves Steinebach

Publication details
- History: 2007–present
- Publisher: John Wiley & Sons (Australia)
- Impact factor: 3.500 (2023)

Standard abbreviations
- ISO 4: Regul. Gov.

Indexing
- ISSN: 1748-5983 (print); 1748-5991 (web)
- LCCN: 2008252051
- OCLC no.: 168252066

Links
- Journal homepage; Online access; Online archive

Regulation & Governance is a peer-reviewed academic journal devoted to the study of the intersecting phenomenon of regulation and governance from the perspective of social science. Established in 2007 by founding editor David Levi-Faur, it is published by John Wiley & Sons.

The current editorial team represents scholarships from North America, Asia, Europe, and South America and welcomes submissions from all over the world. The journal's editors-in-chief are Graeme Auld from Carleton University, Ning Liu from the City University of Hong Kong, Alketa Peci from Fundação Getulio Vargas, and Yves Steinebach from the University of Oslo. The editorial team is backed by an Executive Board consisting of former editors, alongside an Editorial Board made up of distinguished scholars in the field of regulation and governance.

In 2024, Regulation & Governance recorded a total of 360,000 full-text paper views. During the year, it published 71 articles, with an acceptance rate of 12 percent. The average time from submission to the first decision is 5 days. For papers under review, the typical period from initial submission to acceptance is around 8 months.

According to Journal Citation Reports, the journal is ranked 26th out of 430 journals in the field of law, 18th out of 318 in political science, and 4th out of 91 in public administration. placing it within the top 10 percent of journals across these disciplines.

In recent years, the journal has published several key articles on the regulation and governance of artificial intelligence, automated decision-making and disruptive innovation. In addition, it has published key pieces on due diligence and supply chain regulation.

The journal publishes regular submissions as well as special issues. Proposals for special issues are assessed at predetermined times, specifically in April and November each year.

== See also ==
- List of political science journals
- List of law journals
