= Revista de Derecho =

- Discipline: Law
- Language: Spanish
- Edited by: Susan Turner

Publication details
- History: 1990–present
- Publisher: Austral University of Chile (Chile)
- Frequency: Biannual
- Open access: Yes
- License: Creative Commons Attribution

Standard abbreviations
- ISO 4: Rev. Derecho

Indexing
- ISSN: 0716-9132 (print); 0718-0950 (web)
- LCCN: 92660654
- OCLC no.: 26828344

Links
- Journal homepage; Journal page at SciELO; Online access

Revista de Derecho is a biannual peer-reviewed law journal published by the Austral University of Chile. It was established in 1990 and is published by the Austral University of Chile. The editor-in-chief is Susan Turner (Austral University of Chile). The journal is abstracted and indexed in Scopus.
