= Journal of Business & Securities Law =

- Discipline: Law
- Language: English

Publication details
- History: 2005-2019
- Publisher: Michigan State University College of Law (United States)
- Frequency: Biannually

Standard abbreviations
- Bluebook: J. Bus. & Sec. L.
- ISO 4: J. Bus. Secur. Law

Indexing
- ISSN: 1558-609X
- LCCN: 2005212548
- OCLC no.: 62075516

The Journal of Business & Securities Law was a student-edited law journal covering the areas of business and securities law published by students at the Michigan State University College of Law. The Journal published articles on topics including corporate litigation, commercial transactions, employment, e-commerce, securities regulation, and other topics at the intersection of law and business.

The Journal was the sole outlet for the transcription and publication of the annual Midwest Securities Law Institute held at the Michigan State University College of Law. It was also the national host of the annual Elliot A. Spoon Business Law Writing Competition. The Journal was staffed by approximately 25 law students and was headed by a board consisting of an editor-in-chief, executive editor, two managing editors of publication, and a managing editor of articles. The Journal has been cited in various state and federal court decisions around the United States.
