= University of Western Sydney Law Review =

- Discipline: Law
- Language: English

Publication details
- Former name: Macarthur Law Review
- History: 1997-2015
- Publisher: University of Western Sydney School of Law (Australia)
- Frequency: Annually

Standard abbreviations
- ISO 4: Univ. West. Syd. Law Rev.

Indexing
- ISSN: 1446-9294
- LCCN: 2002250063
- OCLC no.: 223856553

Links
- Journal homepage; Online archive

The University of Western Sydney Law Review (previously Macarthur Law Review) was an annual peer-reviewed law review published by the University of Western Sydney School of Law. While its previous issues are still available, archived online, the review ceased publication after its 2014/2015 volume 18.
