= Journal of International Law and International Relations =

Biannual academic journal

- Discipline: Law, international relations
- Language: English
- Edited by: Moyosore Arewa, Philip Omorogbe, and Jane Zhang (2016-2017)

Publication details
- History: 2004-present
- Frequency: Biannually

Standard abbreviations
- ISO 4: J. Int. Law Int. Relat.

Links
- Journal homepage

The Journal of International Law and International Relations (JILIR) was a peer-reviewed academic journal published by the University of Toronto Faculty of Law and the Munk Centre for International Studies. Founded in 2004, it focused on interdisciplinary scholarship at the intersection of international law and international relations and published thirteen volumes between 2004/2005 and 2017.
