= Western Journal of Legal Studies =

Canadian student-run academic journal

- Discipline: Law
- Language: English
- Edited by: Katherine Allos

Publication details
- History: 2012–present
- Publisher: University of Western Ontario (Canada)
- Frequency: Biannual
- Open access: Yes

Standard abbreviations
- Bluebook: W. J. Leg. Stud.
- ISO 4: West. J. Leg. Stud.

Indexing
- ISSN: 1927-9132
- OCLC no.: 783781096

Links
- Journal homepage; Online access; Online archive

The Western Journal of Legal Studies is a student-run peer-reviewed biannual law review at the University of Western Ontario Faculty of Law that was established in 2012. It publishes scholarly work by students, lawyers, and academics and focuses on Canadian and international law.

The journal has been cited by the Supreme Court of Canada, the Alberta Court of Appeal, and several trial courts.

== History ==
Prior to 2012, the University of Western Ontario Faculty of Law was one of a few Canadian law schools without a law review. The journal's creation was supported by dean Ian Holloway, assistant dean Michael Lynk.
