= Deakin Law Review =

- Discipline: Law
- Language: English

Publication details
- History: 1993-present
- Publisher: Deakin University School of Law (Australia)
- Frequency: Biannually

Standard abbreviations
- ISO 4: Deakin Law Rev.

Indexing
- ISSN: 1321-3660
- OCLC no.: 61313161

Links
- Journal homepage

Deakin Law Review is an Australian peer-reviewed law review published biannually by Deakin University School of Law. It was founded in 1993.
