= European Transport Law =

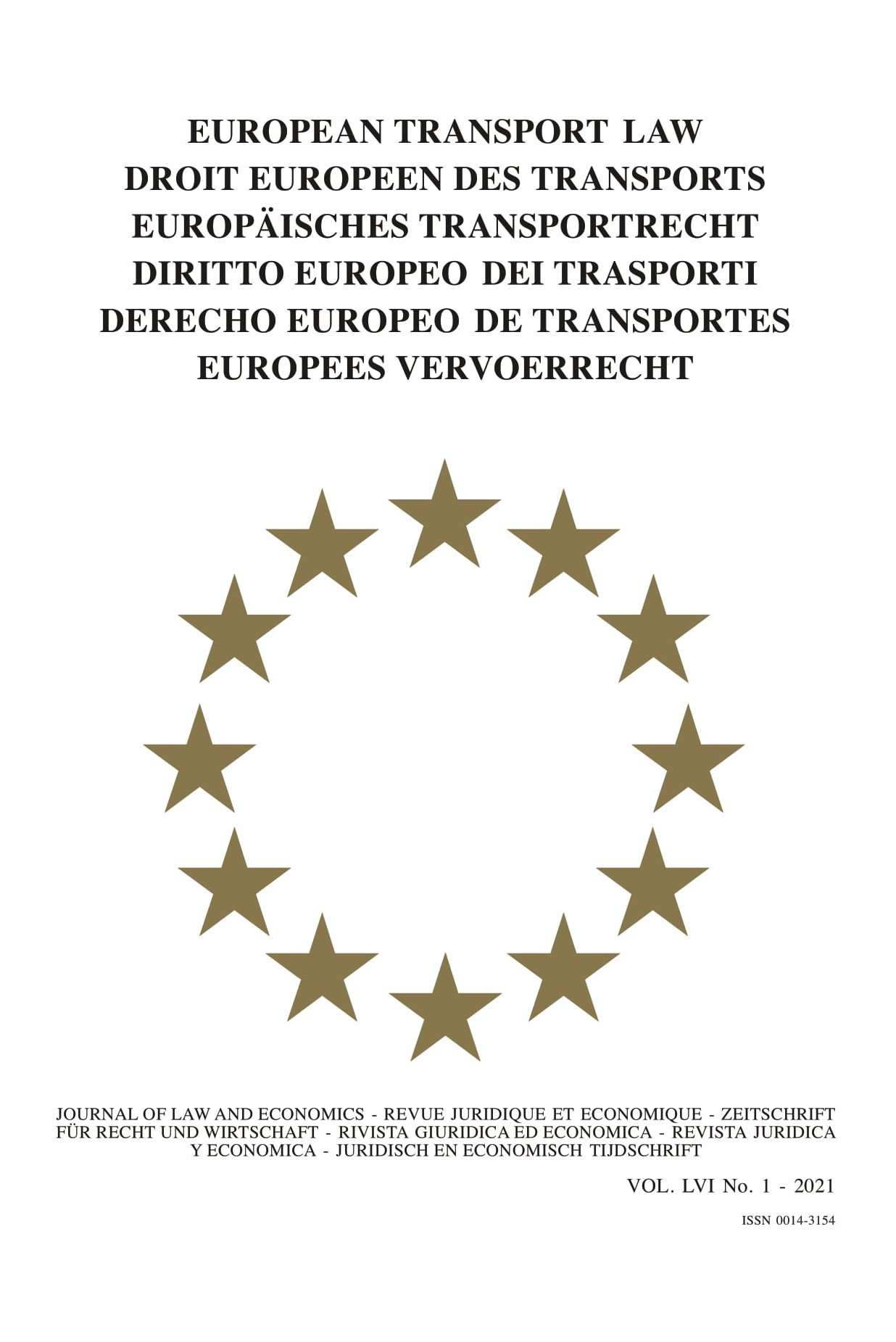
Cover of volume 56, no. 1 (2021)

European Transport Law is a scholarly law journal. It is publishes case notes on transport law decisions from courts throughout Europe, as well as articles in Dutch, English, French, German, Italian and Spanish on all areas of transport law. European Transport Law may be abbreviated to ETL for scholarly citations.

The journal was founded in Antwerp, Belgium in 1965 by the Belgian lawyer Robert Wijffels. Mr Wijffels died in 2010, but his family law firm continues to publish the journal on an annual basis. 2012 marked the 47th volume of European Transport Law.

== Name in Other Languages ==
European Transport Law is titled as follows in the other four languages in which it is published:

- Europees Vervoerrecht
- Droit Européen des Transports
- Europäisches Transportrecht
- Diritto Europeo dei Trasporti
- Derecho Europeo de Transportes
