= African Journal of Legal Studies =

- Discipline: Law
- Language: English
- Edited by: Charles Chernor Jalloh

Publication details
- History: 2005-present
- Publisher: Martinus Nijhoff Publishers
- Frequency: Triannual

Standard abbreviations
- ISO 4: Afr. J. Leg. Stud.

Indexing
- ISSN: 2210-9730 (print); 1708-7384 (web)
- OCLC no.: 803592826

Links
- Journal homepage; Online access

The African Journal of Legal Studies is a peer-reviewed academic journal covering human rights and law issues in Africa. The founding editor-in-chief is Professor Charles Chernor Jalloh (Florida International University College of Law). The journal is abstracted and indexed in ProQuest databases. The journal was established in 2005 under the auspices of the Africa Law Institut. Since 2011 (volume 4), it is published by Martinus Nijhoff Publishers.
