= University of Queensland Law Journal =

- Discipline: Australian law
- Language: English

Publication details
- History: 1948–present
- Frequency: Biannually

Standard abbreviations
- ISO 4: Univ. Qld. Law J.

Links
- Journal homepage

The University of Queensland Law Journal is a leading Australian double-blind peer-reviewed law review. It was established in 1948 and is published three times a year. The editor-in-chief is James Allan.
