= Auckland University Law Review =

- Discipline: New Zealand law
- Language: English

Publication details
- History: 1967–present
- Publisher: University of Auckland

Standard abbreviations
- Bluebook: Auckland U. L. Rev.
- ISO 4: Auckl. Univ. Law Rev.

Indexing
- ISSN: 0067-0510

Links
- Journal homepage

The Auckland University Law Review is an annual law review published by the University of Auckland since 1967. It covers New Zealand law. The language of publication is English.
