= Tulane Journal of International and Comparative Law =

- Discipline: International law
- Language: English

Publication details
- History: 1992–present
- Publisher: Tulane University Law School (USA)
- Frequency: Semiannual

Standard abbreviations
- Bluebook: Tul. J. Int'l & Comp. L.
- ISO 4: Tulane J. Int. Comp. Law

Indexing
- ISSN: 1069-4455

Links
- Journal homepage

The Tulane Journal of International and Comparative Law was founded at Tulane University Law School, in New Orleans, Louisiana, as an outgrowth of that institution's historical tradition as a signpost in the academic world for international and comparative law. The Journal is dedicated to discussing and debating all facets of international law, from human rights to transnational commerce to the historical evolution of current global law. Published twice a year, one of its issues each volume covers a thematic issue, often focused on a related symposium. The Journal is one of the leading law reviews in international and comparative law and, in terms of citation, is in the top quarter of all journals in the nation.

== History ==
Lisa M. Ryan, a partner at Fragomen, Del Rey, Bernsen & Loewy's New York office, founded the journal while she was a student at the Tulane University Law School.

== Distinguished alumni ==
- José M. Ferrer, JD 1999, Miami partner of Baker & McKenzie, former Associate Executive Editor of the Journal
- Lisa M. Ryan, JD 1994, New York City partner of Fragomen; founder of the Journal
- David L. Glogoff, JD 1994, Chief Legal Officer; founder of the Journal

== See also ==
- Comparative law
- International law
- List of International Law Journals
- Tulane University Law School
