= Minnesota Journal of International Law =

- Discipline: Law review
- Language: English
- Edited by: Ally Billeaud

Publication details
- Former name(s): Minnesota Journal of Global Trade
- History: 1992-present
- Publisher: University of Minnesota Law School (United States)
- Frequency: Biannual

Standard abbreviations
- Bluebook: Minn. J. Int'l L.
- ISO 4: Minn. J. Int. Law

Indexing
- ISSN: 1944-0294
- LCCN: 2006245251
- OCLC no.: 63048791

Links
- Journal homepage

The Minnesota Journal of International Law is a biannual law review published by students at the University of Minnesota Law School. It covers international and comparative law and policy, with a particular emphasis on politics, economics, and fundamental rights.

The journal was established in 1992 as the Minnesota Journal of Global Trade, with Daniel L. M. Kennedy as founding editor-in-chief. It obtained its current name in 2006, broadening its scope to include international legal issues beyond trade. In 2009, the journal started an online edition in addition to print. Starting in 2013, the journal publishes an online supplement, entitled Minnesota Journal of International Law Humphrey Supplement, that contains scholarly articles written by Hubert H. Humphrey Fellows.

The journal hosts biennial symposia to discuss timely issues in international law. In 2010, the law school and journal collaborated with the American Society of International Law and hosted its International Economic Law Interest Group's conference, entitled "International Economic Law in a Time of Change" and in 2013, the journal conducted a symposium on "The Future of Warfare: The Law of Tomorrow's Battlefields."
