= Jane C. Ginsburg =

American lawyer and legal scholar (born 1955)

Jane C. Ginsburg FBA
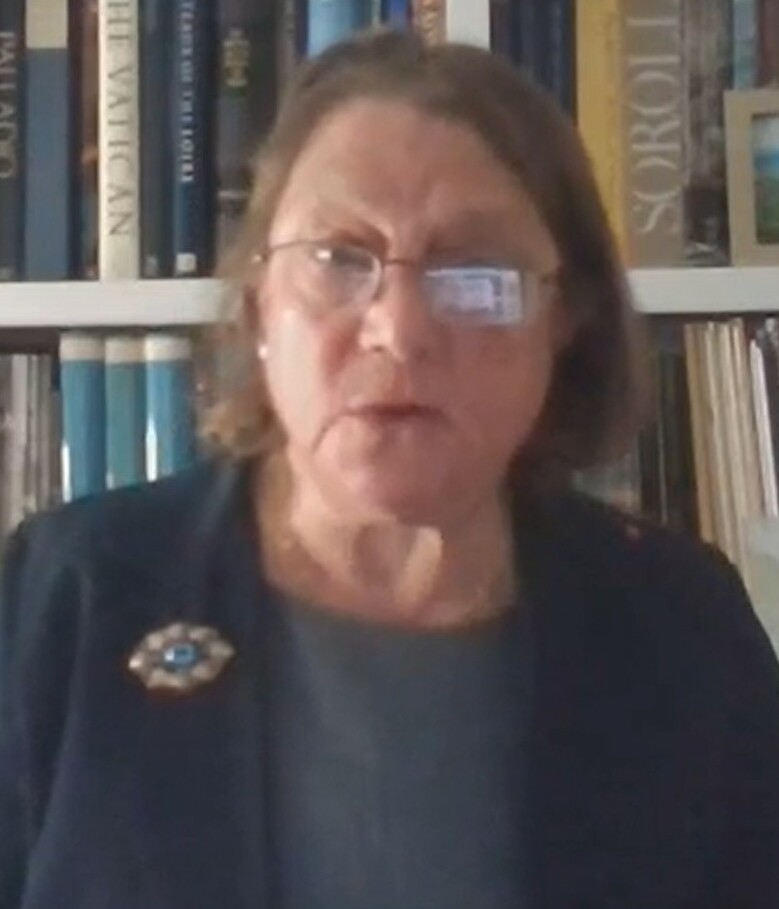
- Ginsburg in 2020
- Born: Jane Carol Ginsburg; July 21, 1955 (age 70); Freeport, New York, U.S.
- Education: University of Chicago (BA, MA); Harvard University (JD); Panthéon-Assas University (DEA, LLD)
- Spouse: George Spera (m. 1981)
- Children: 2
- Parents: Martin D. Ginsburg (father); Ruth Bader Ginsburg (mother)
- Relatives: James Steven Ginsburg (brother)
- Awards: American Philosophical Society (2013)

Jane Carol Ginsburg FBA (born July 21, 1955) is an American attorney. She is the Morton L. Janklow Professor of Literary and Artistic Property Law at the Columbia Law School. She also directs the law school's Kernochan Center for Law, Media and the Arts. In 2011, Ginsburg was elected to the British Academy.

Ginsburg is the daughter of former United States Supreme Court justice Ruth Bader Ginsburg.

== Career ==
An expert on copyright, Ginsburg has written various treatises and law review articles. She received her B.A. and M.A. degrees from the University of Chicago, her J.D. degree from Harvard Law School, a DEA with a Fulbright grant (1985), and a Doctor of Law degree (1995) from Paris 2 Panthéon-Assas University. At Harvard, she served as an editor of the Harvard Law Review. After law school, she clerked for Judge John Gibbons of the United States Court of Appeals for the Third Circuit.

Ginsburg was elected to the American Philosophical Society in 2013.

She is the daughter of United States Supreme Court Justice Ruth Bader Ginsburg and law professor Martin Ginsburg, both of whom formerly served on the Columbia Law School faculty. Justice Ginsburg and Jane are the first mother–daughter pair ever to serve on the same law faculty in the United States. Her brother, James Steven Ginsburg, is the founder of Cedille Records.

== In popular culture ==
In the 2018 feature film On the Basis of Sex, a biography of her mother Ruth, a teenage Jane is portrayed by Cailee Spaeny.

== Personal life ==
In 1981, Ginsburg married George T. Spera Jr. of Mays Landing, New Jersey. Her husband works for the law firm Shearman & Sterling. They have two children. Their son, Paul Spera (born 1986), an actor, graduated from Yale in 2008. Their daughter, Clara Spera (born 1990), graduated from Harvard Law School in 2017, and is married to Scottish actor Rory Boyd.
