= Ruth Bader Ginsburg =

US Supreme Court justice from 1993 to 2020

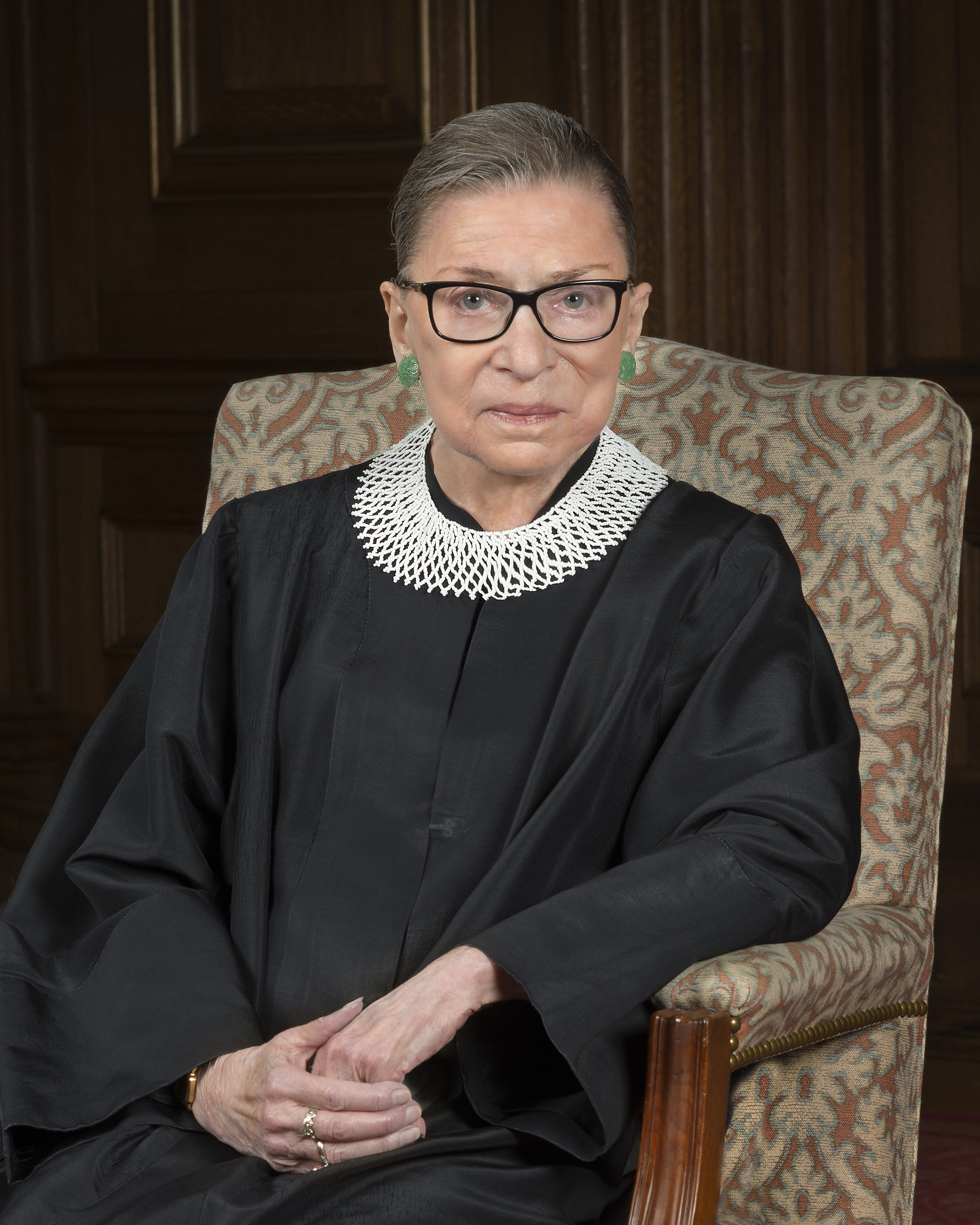
- Official portrait, 2016

Associate Justice of the Supreme Court of the United States
- In office August 10, 1993 – September 18, 2020
- Nominated by: Bill Clinton
- Preceded by: Byron White
- Succeeded by: Amy Coney Barrett

Judge of the United States Court of Appeals for the District of Columbia Circuit
- In office June 30, 1980 – August 9, 1993
- Nominated by: Jimmy Carter
- Preceded by: Harold Leventhal
- Succeeded by: David Tatel

Personal details
- Born: Joan Ruth Bader; March 15, 1933 New York City, U.S.
- Died: September 18, 2020 (aged 87) Washington, D.C., U.S.
- Resting place: Arlington National Cemetery
- Party: Democratic
- Spouse: Martin D. Ginsburg (m. 1954; died 2010)
- Children: Jane; James
- Education: Cornell University (BA); Harvard University (attended); Columbia University (LLB)
- Ginsburg's voice Ginsburg delivering the decision Iowa v. Tovar. Recorded March 8, 2004

Joan Ruth Bader Ginsburg (/ˈbeɪdər ˈɡɪnzbɜːrɡ/ BAY-dər GHINZ-burg; née Bader; March 15, 1933 – September 18, 2020) was an American lawyer and jurist who served as an associate justice of the Supreme Court of the United States from 1993 until her death in 2020. She was nominated by President Bill Clinton to replace retiring justice Byron White, and at the time was viewed as a moderate consensus-builder. Ginsburg was the first Jewish woman and the second woman to serve on the Court, after Sandra Day O'Connor. During her tenure, Ginsburg authored the majority opinions in cases such as United States v. Virginia (1996), Olmstead v. L.C. (1999), Friends of the Earth, Inc. v. Laidlaw Environmental Services, Inc. (2000), and City of Sherrill v. Oneida Indian Nation of New York (2005). Later in her tenure, Ginsburg received attention for passionate dissents that reflected liberal views of the law.

Ginsburg was born and grew up in Brooklyn, New York. Just over a year later her older sister and only sibling, Marilyn, died of meningitis at the age of six. Her mother died shortly before she graduated from high school. She earned her bachelor's degree at Cornell University and married Martin D. Ginsburg, becoming a mother before starting law school at Harvard, where she was one of the few women in her class. Ginsburg transferred to Columbia Law School, where she graduated joint first in her class. During the early 1960s she worked with the Columbia Law School Project on International Procedure, learned Swedish, and co-authored a book with Swedish jurist Anders Bruzelius; her work in Sweden profoundly influenced her thinking on gender equality. She then became a professor at Rutgers Law School and Columbia Law School, teaching civil procedure as one of the few women in her field and the first female member of the law faculty at Columbia to attain tenure.

Ginsburg spent much of her legal career as an advocate for gender equality and women's rights, winning many arguments before the Supreme Court. She advocated as a volunteer attorney for the American Civil Liberties Union and was a member of its board of directors and one of its general counsel in the 1970s. In 1980, President Jimmy Carter appointed her to the U.S. Court of Appeals for the District of Columbia Circuit, where she served until her appointment to the Supreme Court in 1993. Between O'Connor's retirement in 2006 and the appointment of Sonia Sotomayor in 2009, she was the only female justice on the Supreme Court. During that time, Ginsburg became more forceful with her dissents, such as with Ledbetter v. Goodyear Tire & Rubber Co. (2007).

Despite two bouts with cancer and public pleas from liberal law scholars, she decided not to retire in 2013 or 2014 when President Barack Obama and a Democratic-controlled Senate could appoint and confirm her successor. Ginsburg died at her home in Washington, D.C., on September 18, 2020, at the age of 87, from complications of metastatic pancreatic cancer. The vacancy created by her death was filled 39 days later by Amy Coney Barrett. The result was one of three major rightward shifts in the Court since 1953, following the appointment of Clarence Thomas to replace Thurgood Marshall in 1991 and the appointment of Warren Burger to replace Earl Warren in 1969.

== Early life and education ==
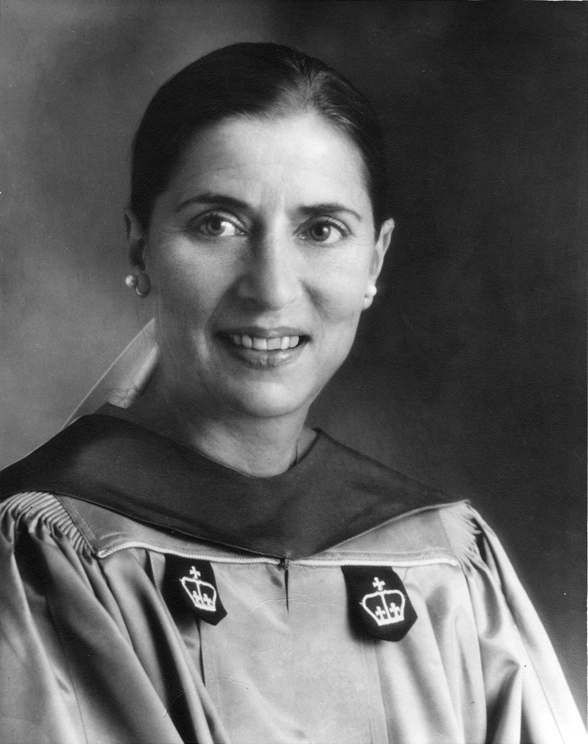
Ginsburg in 1959, wearing her Columbia Law School academic regalia

Joan Ruth Bader was born on March 15, 1933, at Beth Moses Hospital in the Brooklyn borough of New York City, the second daughter of Celia (née Amster) and Nathan Bader, who lived in Brooklyn's Flatbush neighborhood. Her father was a Jewish emigrant from Odesa, Ukraine, at that time part of the Russian Empire, and her mother was born in New York to Jewish parents who came from Kraków, Poland, at that time part of Austria-Hungary. The Baders' elder daughter Marylin died of meningitis at age six. Joan, who was 14 months old when Marylin died, was known to the family as "Kiki", a nickname Marylin had given her for being "a kicky baby". When Joan started school, Celia discovered that her daughter's class had several other girls named Joan, so Celia suggested the teacher call her daughter by her second name, Ruth, to avoid confusion. Although not devout, the Bader family belonged to East Midwood Jewish Center, a Conservative synagogue, where Ruth learned tenets of the Jewish faith and gained familiarity with the Hebrew language. Ruth was not allowed to have a bat mitzvah ceremony because of Orthodox restrictions on women reading from the Torah, which upset her. Starting as a camper from the age of four, she attended Camp Che-Na-Wah, a Jewish summer program at Lake Balfour near Minerva, New York, where she was later a camp counselor until the age of eighteen.

Celia took an active role in her daughter's education, often taking her to the library. Celia had been a good student in her youth, graduating from high school at age 15, yet she could not further her own education because her family instead chose to send her brother to college. Celia wanted her daughter to get more education, which she thought would allow Ruth to become a high school history teacher. Ruth attended James Madison High School, whose law program later dedicated a courtroom in her honor. Celia struggled with cancer throughout Ruth's high school years and died the day before Ruth's high school graduation.

Ruth Bader attended Cornell University in Ithaca, New York, where she was a member of Alpha Epsilon Phi sorority. While at Cornell, she met Martin D. Ginsburg at age 17. She graduated from Cornell with a Bachelor of Arts degree in government on June 23, 1954. While at Cornell, Bader studied under Russian-American novelist Vladimir Nabokov, and she later identified Nabokov as a major influence on her development as a writer. She was a member of Phi Beta Kappa and the highest-ranking female student in her graduating class. Bader married Ginsburg a month after her graduation from Cornell. The couple moved to Fort Sill, Oklahoma, where Martin Ginsburg, a Reserve Officers' Training Corps graduate, was stationed as a called-up active duty United States Army Reserve officer during the Korean War. At age 21, Ruth Bader Ginsburg worked for the Social Security Administration office in Oklahoma, where she was demoted after becoming pregnant with her first child. She gave birth to a daughter in 1955.

In the fall of 1956, Ruth Bader Ginsburg enrolled at Harvard Law School, where she was one of only 9 women in a class of about 500 men. The dean of Harvard Law, Erwin Griswold, reportedly invited all the female law students to dinner at his family home and asked the female law students, including Ginsburg, "Why are you at Harvard Law School, taking the place of a man?" (Note: The dean later claimed he was trying to learn students' stories.) When her husband took a job in New York City, that same dean denied Ginsburg's request to complete her third year towards a Harvard law degree at Columbia Law School, so Ginsburg transferred to Columbia and became the first woman to be on two major law reviews: the Harvard Law Review and Columbia Law Review. In 1959, she earned her law degree at Columbia and tied for first in her class.

== Early career ==
At the start of her legal career, Ginsburg encountered difficulty in finding employment. In 1960, Supreme Court Justice Felix Frankfurter rejected Ginsburg for a clerkship because of her gender. He did so despite a strong recommendation from Albert Martin Sacks, who was a professor and later dean of Harvard Law School. (Note: According to Ginsburg, Justice William O. Douglas hired the first female Supreme Court clerk in 1944, and the second female law clerk was not hired until 1966.) Columbia law professor Gerald Gunther also pushed for Judge Edmund L. Palmieri of the U.S. District Court for the Southern District of New York to hire Ginsburg as a law clerk, threatening to never recommend another Columbia student to Palmieri if he did not give Ginsburg the opportunity and guaranteeing to provide the judge with a replacement clerk should Ginsburg not succeed. Later that year, Ginsburg began her clerkship for Judge Palmieri, and she held the position for two years.

=== Academia ===
From 1961 to 1963, Ginsburg was a research associate and then an associate director of the Columbia Law School Project on International Procedure, working alongside director Hans Smit; she learned Swedish to co-author a book with Anders Bruzelius on civil procedure in Sweden. Ginsburg conducted extensive research for her book at Lund University in Sweden. Ginsburg's time in Sweden and her association with the Swedish Bruzelius family of jurists also influenced her thinking on gender equality. She was inspired when she observed the changes in Sweden, where women were 20 to 25 percent of all law students; one of the judges whom Ginsburg observed for her research was eight months pregnant and still working. Bruzelius' daughter, Norwegian supreme court justice and president of the Norwegian Association for Women's Rights, Karin M. Bruzelius, herself a law student when Ginsburg worked with her father, said that "by getting close to my family, Ruth realized that one could live in a completely different way, that women could have a different lifestyle and legal position than what they had in the United States."

Ginsburg's first position as a professor was at Rutgers Law School in 1963. She was paid less than her male colleagues because, she was told, "your husband has a very good job." At the time Ginsburg entered academia, she was one of fewer than twenty female law professors in the United States. She was a professor of law at Rutgers from 1963 to 1972, teaching mainly civil procedure and receiving tenure in 1969.

In 1970, she co-founded the Women's Rights Law Reporter, the first law journal in the U.S. to focus exclusively on women's rights. From 1972 to 1980, she taught at Columbia Law School, becoming its first tenured woman. At Columbia, she co-authored the first law school casebook on sex discrimination and taught the first legal seminar on sex discrimination. She also spent a year as a fellow of the Center for Advanced Study in the Behavioral Sciences at Stanford University from 1977 to 1978.

=== Litigation and advocacy ===
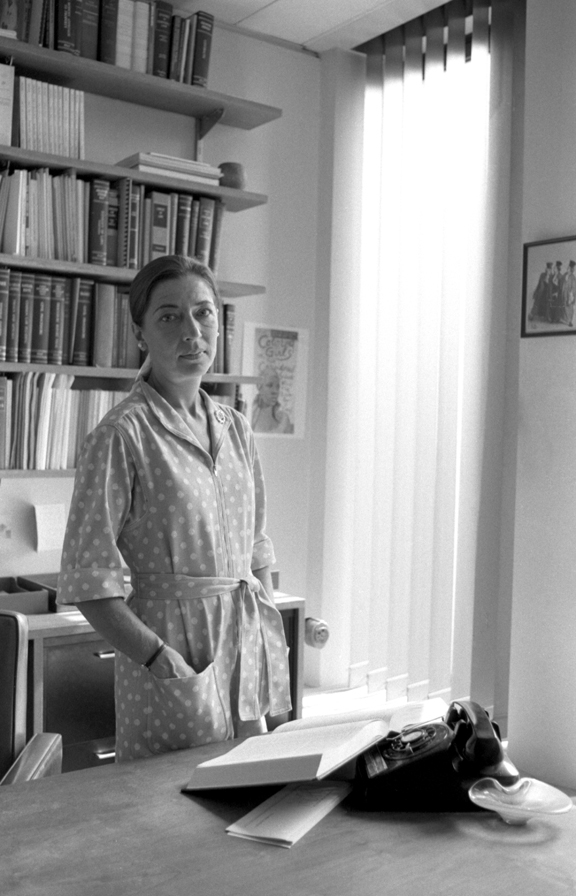
Ginsburg in 1977, photographed by Lynn Gilbert

In 1972, Ginsburg co-founded the Women's Rights Project at the American Civil Liberties Union (ACLU), and in 1973, she became the Project's general counsel. The Women's Rights Project and related ACLU projects participated in more than 300 gender discrimination cases by 1974. As the director of the ACLU's Women's Rights Project, she argued six gender discrimination cases before the Supreme Court between 1973 and 1976, winning five. Rather than asking the Court to end all gender discrimination at once, Ginsburg charted a strategic course, taking aim at specific discriminatory statutes and building on each successive victory. She chose plaintiffs carefully, at times picking male plaintiffs to demonstrate that gender discrimination was harmful to both men and women. The laws Ginsburg targeted included those that on the surface appeared beneficial to women, but in fact reinforced the notion that women needed to be dependent on men. Her strategic advocacy extended to word choice, favoring the use of "gender" instead of "sex", after her secretary suggested the word "sex" would serve as a distraction to judges. She attained a reputation as a skilled oral advocate, and her work led directly to the end of gender discrimination in many areas of the law.

Ginsburg volunteered to write the brief for Reed v. Reed, 404 U.S. 71 (1971), in which the Supreme Court extended the protections of the Equal Protection Clause of the Fourteenth Amendment to women. (Note: Ginsburg listed Dorothy Kenyon and Pauli Murray as co-authors on the brief in recognition of their contributions to feminist legal argument.) In 1972, she argued before the 10th Circuit in Moritz v. Commissioner on behalf of a man who had been denied a caregiver deduction because of his gender. As amicus she argued in Frontiero v. Richardson, 411 U.S. 677 (1973), which challenged a statute making it more difficult for a female service member (Frontiero) to claim an increased housing allowance for her husband than for a male service member seeking the same allowance for his wife. Ginsburg argued that the statute treated women as inferior, and the Supreme Court ruled 8–1 in Frontiero's favor. The court again ruled in Ginsburg's favor in Weinberger v. Wiesenfeld, 420 U.S. 636 (1975), where Ginsburg represented a widower denied survivor benefits under Social Security, which permitted widows but not widowers to collect special benefits while caring for minor children. She argued that the statute discriminated against male survivors of workers by denying them the same protection as their female counterparts.

In 1973, the same year Roe v. Wade was decided, Ginsburg filed a federal case to challenge involuntary sterilization, suing members of the Eugenics Board of North Carolina on behalf of Nial Ruth Cox, a mother who had been coercively sterilized under North Carolina's Sterilization of Persons Mentally Defective program on penalty of her family losing welfare benefits. During a 2009 interview with Emily Bazelon of The New York Times, Ginsburg stated: "I had thought that at the time Roe was decided, there was concern about population growth and particularly growth in populations that we don't want to have too many of." Bazelon conducted a follow-up interview with Ginsburg in 2012 at a joint appearance at Yale University, where Ginsburg claimed her 2009 quote was vastly misinterpreted and clarified her stance.

Ginsburg filed an amicus brief and sat with counsel at oral argument for Craig v. Boren, 429 U.S. 190 (1976), which challenged an Oklahoma statute that set different minimum drinking ages for men and women. For the first time, the court imposed what is known as intermediate scrutiny on laws discriminating based on gender, a heightened standard of Constitutional review. Her last case as an attorney before the Supreme Court was Duren v. Missouri, 439 U.S. 357 (1979), which challenged the validity of voluntary jury duty for women, on the ground that participation in jury duty was a citizen's vital governmental service and therefore should not be optional for women. At the end of Ginsburg's oral argument, then-Associate Justice William Rehnquist asked Ginsburg, "You won't settle for putting Susan B. Anthony on the new dollar, then?" Ginsburg said she considered responding, "We won't settle for tokens," but instead opted not to answer the question.

Legal scholars and advocates credit Ginsburg's body of work with making significant legal advances for women under the Equal Protection Clause of the Constitution. Taken together, Ginsburg's legal victories discouraged legislatures from treating women and men differently under the law. She continued to work on the ACLU's Women's Rights Project until her appointment to the Federal Bench in 1980. Later, colleague Antonin Scalia praised Ginsburg's skills as an advocate. "She became the leading (and very successful) litigator on behalf of women's rights—the Thurgood Marshall of that cause, so to speak." This was a comparison that had first been made by former solicitor general Erwin Griswold who was also her former professor and dean at Harvard Law School, in a speech given in 1985. (Note: Janet Benshoof, the president of the Center for Reproductive Law and Policy, made a similar comparison between Ginsburg and Marshall in 1993.)

== U.S. Court of Appeals ==
In light of the mounting backlog in the federal judiciary, Congress passed the Omnibus Judgeship Act of 1978 increasing the number of federal judges by 117 in district courts and another 35 to be added to the circuit courts. The law placed an emphasis on ensuring that the judges included women and minority groups, a matter that was important to President Jimmy Carter who had been elected two years before. The bill also required that the nomination process consider the character and experience of the candidates. Ginsburg was considering a change in career as soon as Carter was elected. She was interviewed by the Department of Justice to become Solicitor General, the position she most desired, but knew that she and the African-American candidate who was interviewed the same day had little chance of being appointed by Attorney General Griffin Bell.

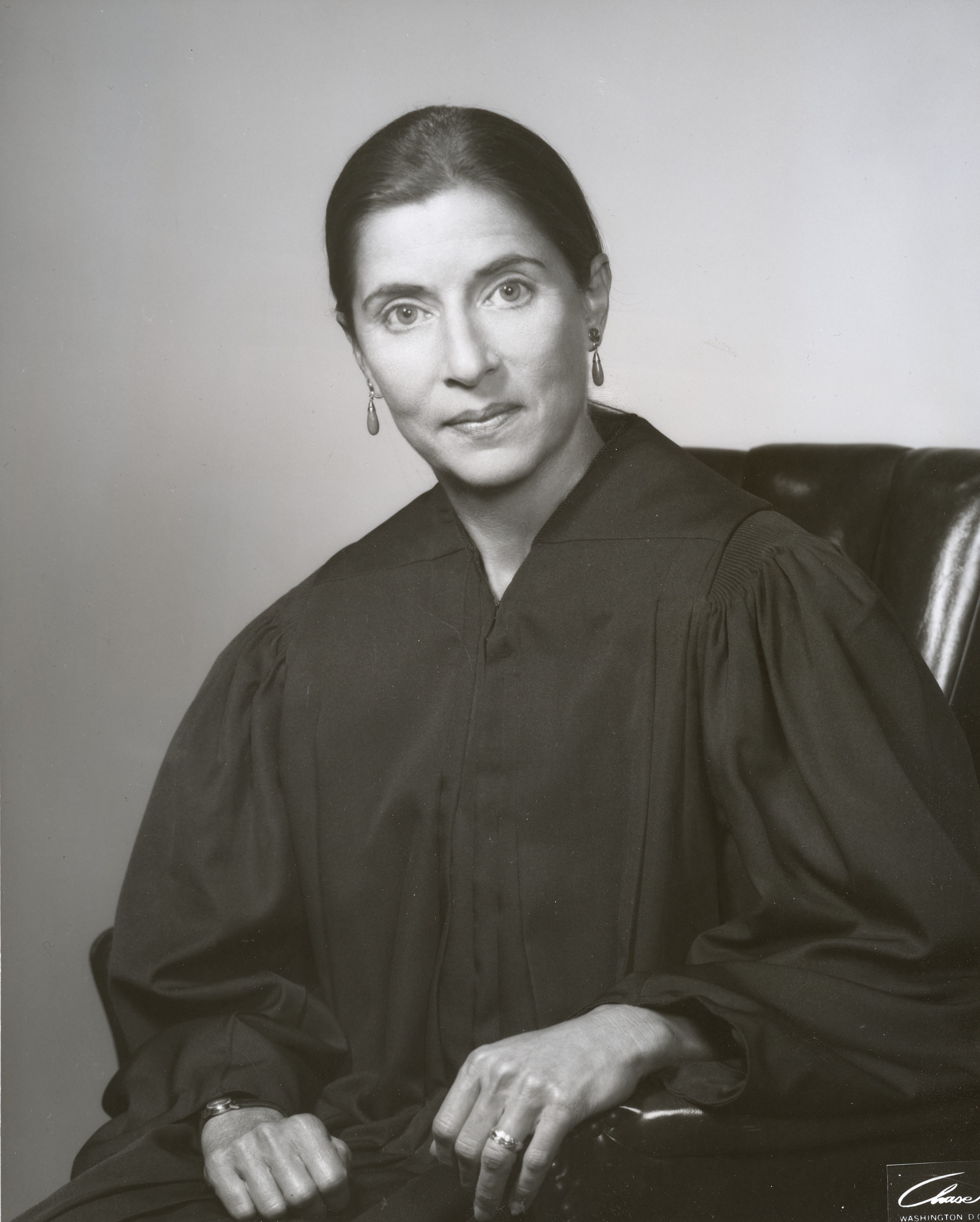
Ginsburg in 1981

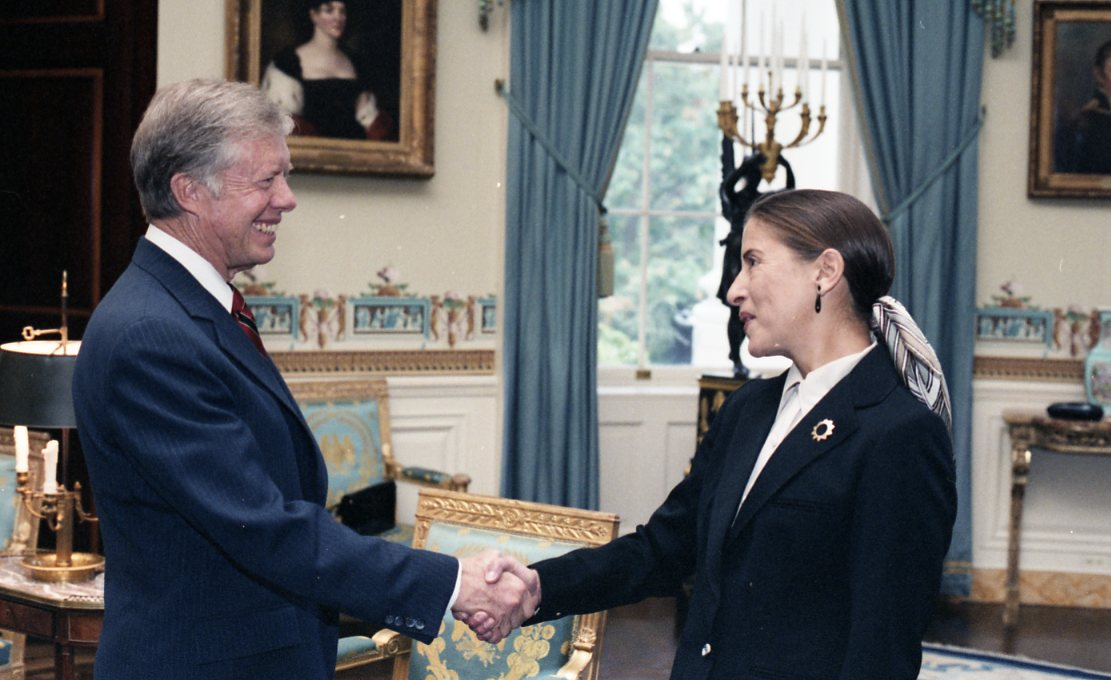
Ginsburg with President Jimmy Carter in 1980

At the time, Ginsburg was a fellow at Stanford University where she was working on a written account of her work in litigation and advocacy for equal rights. Her husband was a visiting professor at Stanford Law School and was ready to leave his firm, Weil, Gotshal & Manges, for a tenured position. He was at the same time working hard to promote a possible judgeship for his wife. In January 1979, she filled out the questionnaire for possible nominees to the U.S. Court of Appeals for the Second Circuit, and another for the District of Columbia Circuit. Ginsburg was nominated by President Carter on April 14, 1980, to a seat on the DC Circuit vacated by Judge Harold Leventhal upon his death. She was confirmed by the United States Senate on June 18, 1980, and received her commission later that day.

During her time as a judge on the DC Circuit, Ginsburg often found consensus with her colleagues including conservatives Robert H. Bork and Antonin Scalia. Her time on the court earned her a reputation as a "cautious jurist" and a moderate. Her service ended on August 9, 1993, due to her elevation to the United States Supreme Court, and she was replaced by Judge David S. Tatel.

== Supreme Court ==
=== Nomination and confirmation ===
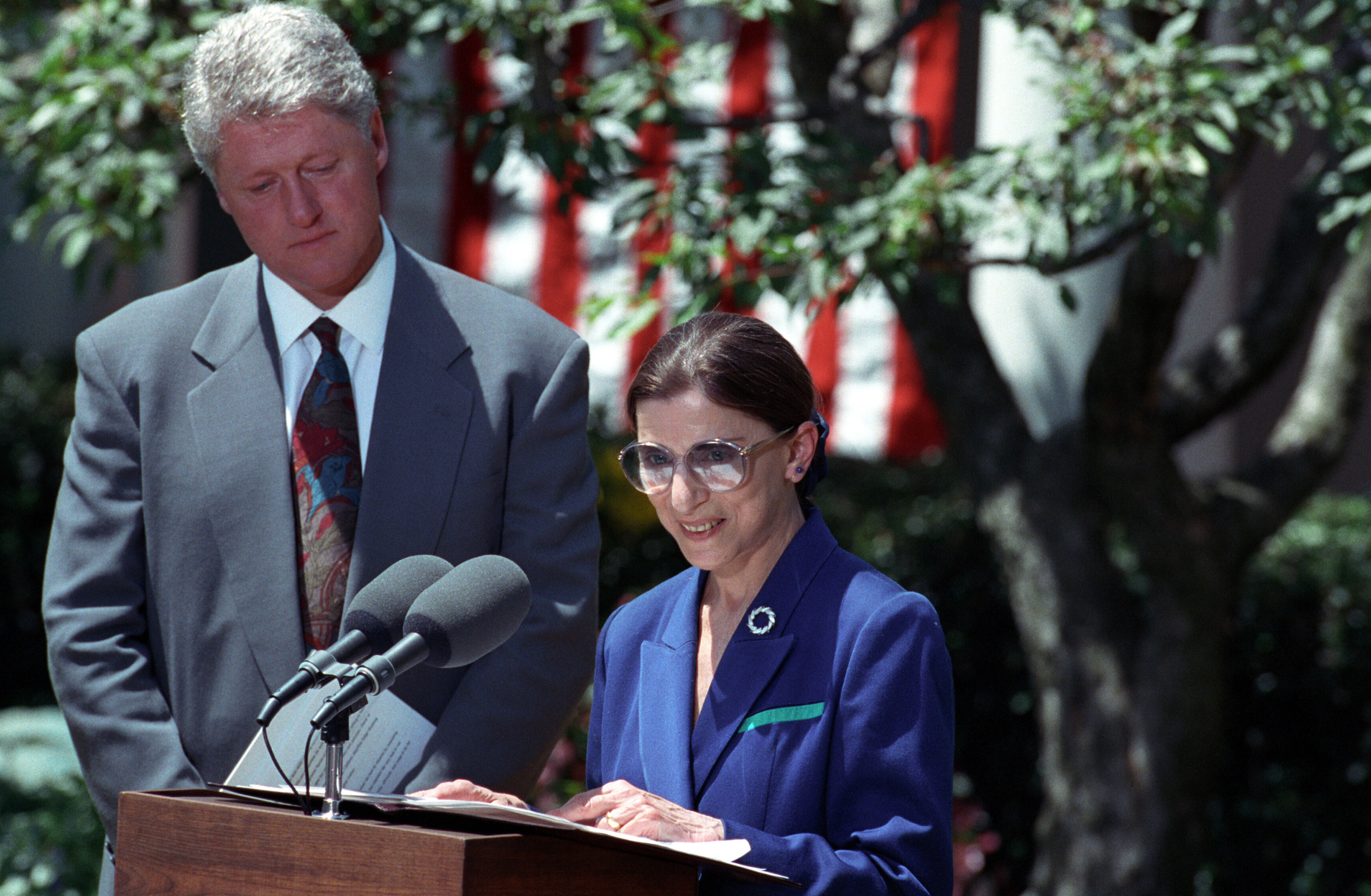
Ginsburg officially accepting the nomination from President Bill Clinton on June 14, 1993

President Bill Clinton nominated Ginsburg as an associate justice of the Supreme Court on June 22, 1993, to fill the seat vacated by retiring justice Byron White. She was recommended to Clinton by then–U.S. attorney general Janet Reno, after a suggestion by Utah Republican senator Orrin Hatch. At the time of her nomination, Ginsburg was viewed as having been a moderate and a consensus-builder in her time on the appeals court. Clinton was reportedly looking to increase the Court's diversity, which Ginsburg did as the first Jewish justice since the 1969 resignation of Justice Abe Fortas. She was the second female and the first Jewish female justice of the Supreme Court. She eventually became the longest-serving Jewish justice. The American Bar Association's Standing Committee on the Federal Judiciary rated Ginsburg as "well qualified", its highest rating for a prospective justice.

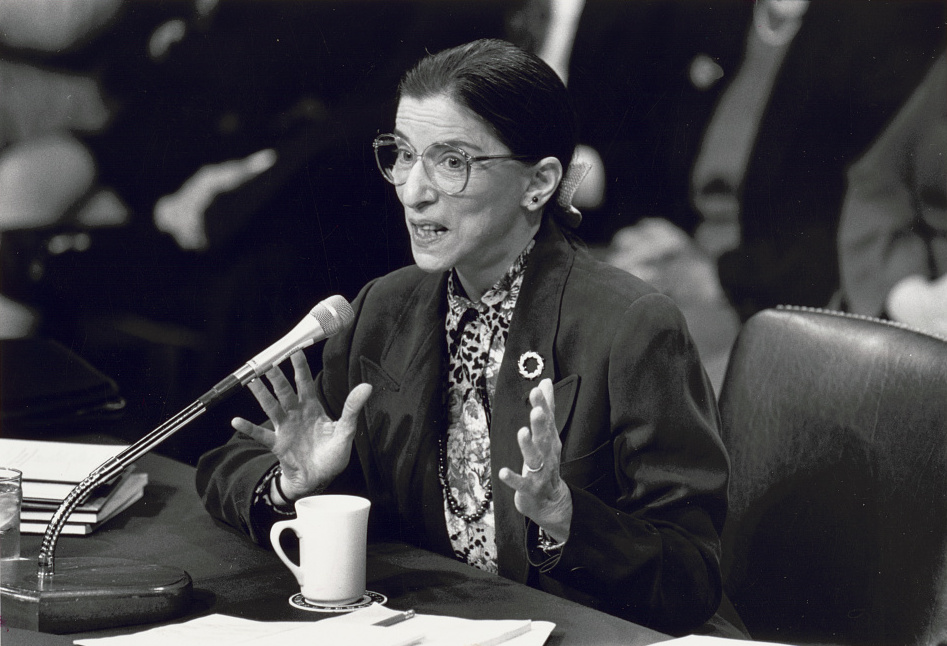
Ginsburg giving testimony before the Senate Judiciary Committee during the hearings on her nomination to be an associate justice

During her testimony before the Senate Judiciary Committee as part of the confirmation hearings, Ginsburg refused to answer questions about her view on the constitutionality of some issues such as the death penalty as it was an issue she might have to vote on if it came before the Court.

At the same time, Ginsburg did answer questions about some potentially controversial issues. For instance, she affirmed her belief in a constitutional right to privacy and explained at some length her personal judicial philosophy and thoughts regarding gender equality. Ginsburg was more forthright in discussing her views on topics about which she had previously written. The United States Senate confirmed her by a 96–3 vote on August 3, 1993. (Note: The three negative votes came from Don Nickles (R-Oklahoma), Bob Smith (R-New Hampshire) and Jesse Helms (R-North Carolina), while Donald W. Riegle Jr. (D-Michigan) did not vote.) She received her commission on August 5, 1993 and took her judicial oath on August 10, 1993.

Ginsburg's name was later invoked during the confirmation process of John Roberts. Ginsburg was not the first nominee to avoid answering certain specific questions before Congress, (Note: Felix Frankfurter was the first nominee to answer questions before Congress in 1939. The issue of how much nominees are expected to answer arose during hearings for O'Connor and Scalia.) and as a young attorney in 1981 Roberts had advised against Supreme Court nominees' giving specific responses. Nevertheless, some conservative commentators and senators invoked the phrase "Ginsburg precedent" to defend his demurrers. In a September 28, 2005, speech at Wake Forest University, Ginsburg said Roberts's refusal to answer questions during his Senate confirmation hearings on some cases was "unquestionably right".

=== Supreme Court tenure ===
Chief Justice William Rehnquist swearing in Ginsburg as an associate justice of the Supreme Court, as her husband Martin Ginsburg and President Clinton watch

Ginsburg characterized her performance on the Court as a cautious approach to adjudication. She argued in a speech shortly before her nomination to the Court that "[m]easured motions seem to me right, in the main, for constitutional as well as common law adjudication. Doctrinal limbs too swiftly shaped, experience teaches, may prove unstable." Legal scholar Cass Sunstein characterized Ginsburg as a "rational minimalist", a jurist who seeks to build cautiously on precedent rather than pushing the Constitution towards her own vision.

The retirement of Justice Sandra Day O'Connor in 2006 left Ginsburg as the only woman on the Court. (Note: Ginsburg remained the only female justice on the Court until Sotomayor was sworn in on August 7, 2009.) Linda Greenhouse of The New York Times referred to the subsequent 2006–2007 term of the Court as "the time when Justice Ruth Bader Ginsburg found her voice, and used it". The term also marked the first time in Ginsburg's history with the Court where she read multiple dissents from the bench, a tactic employed to signal more intense disagreement with the majority.

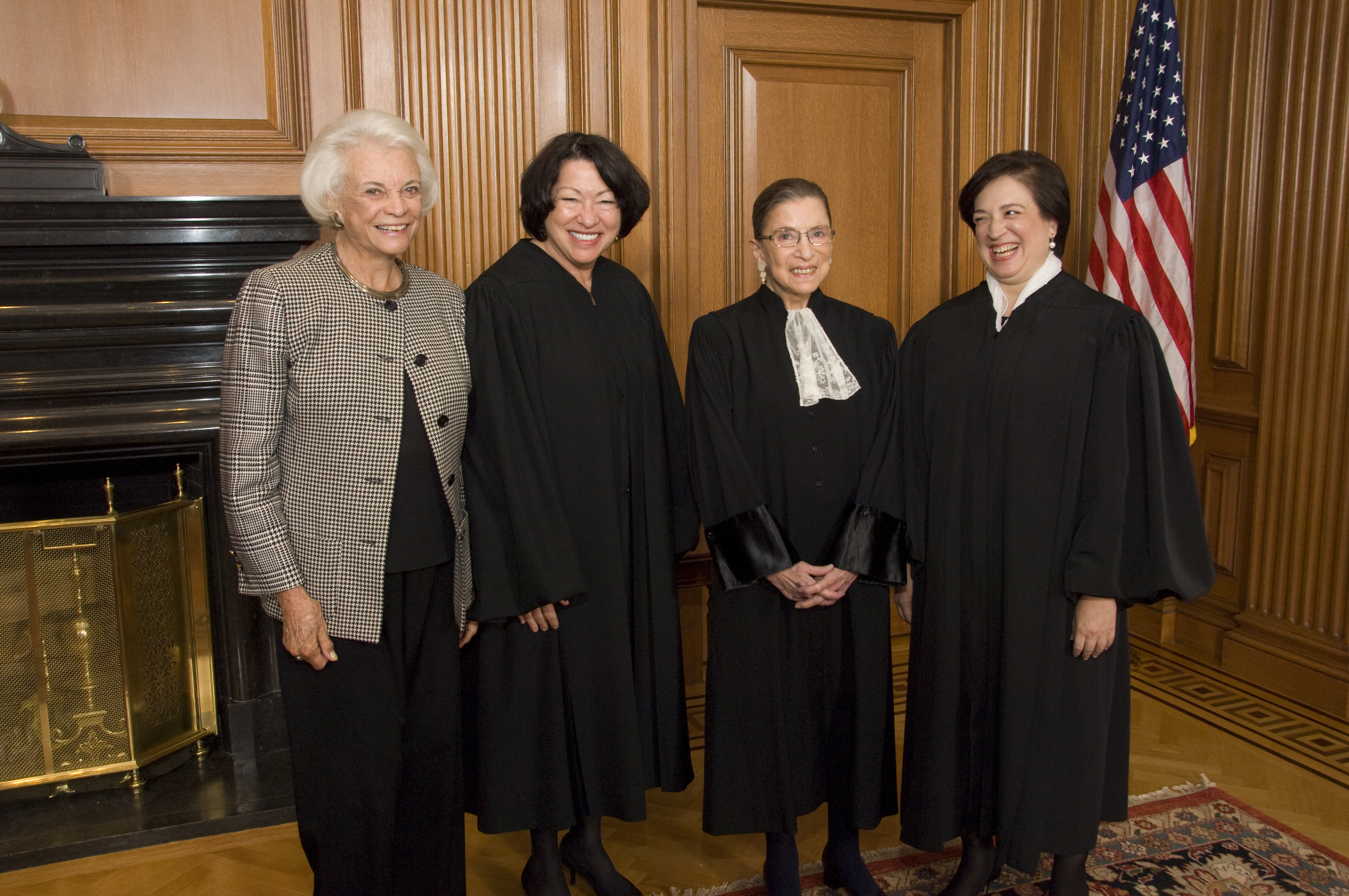
Sandra Day O'Connor, Sonia Sotomayor, Ginsburg, and Elena Kagan, 2010

With the retirement of Justice John Paul Stevens, Ginsburg became the senior member of what was sometimes referred to as the Court's "liberal wing". When the Court split 5–4 along ideological lines and the liberal justices were in the minority, Ginsburg often had the authority to assign authorship of the dissenting opinion because of her seniority. (Note: The 2018 case of Sessions v. Dimaya marked the first time Ginsburg was able to assign a majority opinion, when Justice Neil Gorsuch voted with the liberal wing. Ginsburg assigned the opinion to Justice Elena Kagan.) Ginsburg was a proponent of the liberal dissenters speaking "with one voice" and, where practicable, presenting a unified approach to which all the dissenting justices can agree.

During Ginsburg's entire Supreme Court tenure from 1993 to 2020, she only hired one African-American clerk (Paul J. Watford). During her 13 years on the United States Court of Appeals for the District of Columbia Circuit, she never hired an African-American clerk, intern, or secretary. The lack of diversity was briefly an issue during her 1993 confirmation hearing. When this issue was raised by the Senate Judiciary Committee, Ginsburg stated that "If you confirm me for this job, my attractiveness to black candidates is going to improve." This issue received renewed attention after more than a hundred of her former legal clerks served as pallbearers during her funeral.

==== Gender discrimination ====
Ginsburg authored the Court's opinion in United States v. Virginia, 518 U.S. 515 (1996), which struck down the Virginia Military Institute's (VMI) male-only admissions policy as violating the Equal Protection Clause of the Fourteenth Amendment. For Ginsburg, a state actor could not use gender to deny women equal protection; therefore VMI must allow women the opportunity to attend VMI with its unique educational methods. Ginsburg emphasized that the government must show an "exceedingly persuasive justification" to use a classification based on sex. VMI proposed a separate institute for women, but Ginsburg found this solution reminiscent of the effort by Texas decades earlier to preserve the University of Texas Law School for Whites by establishing a separate school for Blacks.

Ginsburg dissented in the Court's decision on Ledbetter v. Goodyear, 550 U.S. 618 (2007), in which plaintiff Lilly Ledbetter sued her employer, claiming pay discrimination based on her gender, in violation of Title VII of the Civil Rights Act of 1964. In a 5–4 decision, the majority interpreted the statute of limitations as starting to run at the time of every pay period, even if a woman did not know she was being paid less than her male colleague until later. Ginsburg found the result absurd, pointing out that women often do not know they are being paid less, and therefore it was unfair to expect them to act at the time of each paycheck. She also called attention to the reluctance women may have in male-dominated fields to making waves by filing lawsuits over small amounts, choosing instead to wait until the disparity accumulates. As part of her dissent, Ginsburg called on Congress to amend Title VII to undo the Court's decision with legislation. Following the election of President Barack Obama in 2008, the Lilly Ledbetter Fair Pay Act, making it easier for employees to win pay discrimination claims, became law. Ginsburg was credited with helping to inspire the law.

==== Abortion rights ====
Ginsburg discussed her views on abortion and gender equality in a 2009 New York Times interview, in which she said, "[t]he basic thing is that the government has no business making that choice for a woman." Although Ginsburg consistently supported abortion rights and joined in the Court's opinion striking down Nebraska's partial-birth abortion law in Stenberg v. Carhart, 530 U.S. 914 (2000), on the 40th anniversary of the Court's ruling in Roe v. Wade, 410 U.S. 113 (1973), she criticized the decision in Roe as terminating a nascent democratic movement to liberalize abortion laws which might have built a more durable consensus in support of abortion rights.

Ginsburg was in the minority for Gonzales v. Carhart, 550 U.S. 124 (2007), a 5–4 decision upholding restrictions on partial birth abortion. In her dissent, Ginsburg opposed the majority's decision to defer to legislative findings that the procedure was not safe for women. Ginsburg focused her ire on the way Congress reached its findings and with their veracity. Joining the majority for Whole Woman's Health v. Hellerstedt, 579 U.S. 582 (2016), a case which struck down parts of a 2013 Texas law regulating abortion providers, Ginsburg also authored a short concurring opinion which was even more critical of the legislation at issue. She asserted the legislation was not aimed at protecting women's health, as Texas had said, but rather to impede women's access to abortions.

==== Religious freedom ====
On May 31, 2005, Ginsburg wrote the majority opinion in Cutter v. Wilkinson that facilities utilizing federal funds cannot deny prisoners accommodations necessary for the practice of their religious beliefs. In doing so, Ginsburg held that RLUIPA was a valid accommodation permitted by the First Amendment's Establishment Clause. In addition, Ginsburg acknowledged that the free exercise of religion encompasses both belief and action but noted that accommodation of a religious belief did not predispose equal accommodation for a non-secular preference.

On June 28, 2010, Ginsburg wrote the majority opinion in Christian Legal Society v. Martinez relating to a campus policy of acceptance of all students, regardless of status or belief, in becoming an officially recognized student group. Ginsburg ruled that a religious-based group stood at odds with an "all-comers" campus policy by singling out a religious group for exclusion in a manner at odds with the "limited public forum" of the campus. Such a public forum was thus legally obligated to provide equal access via open membership and was determined to not be required to officially recognize a student group at odds with it.

==== Search and seizure ====
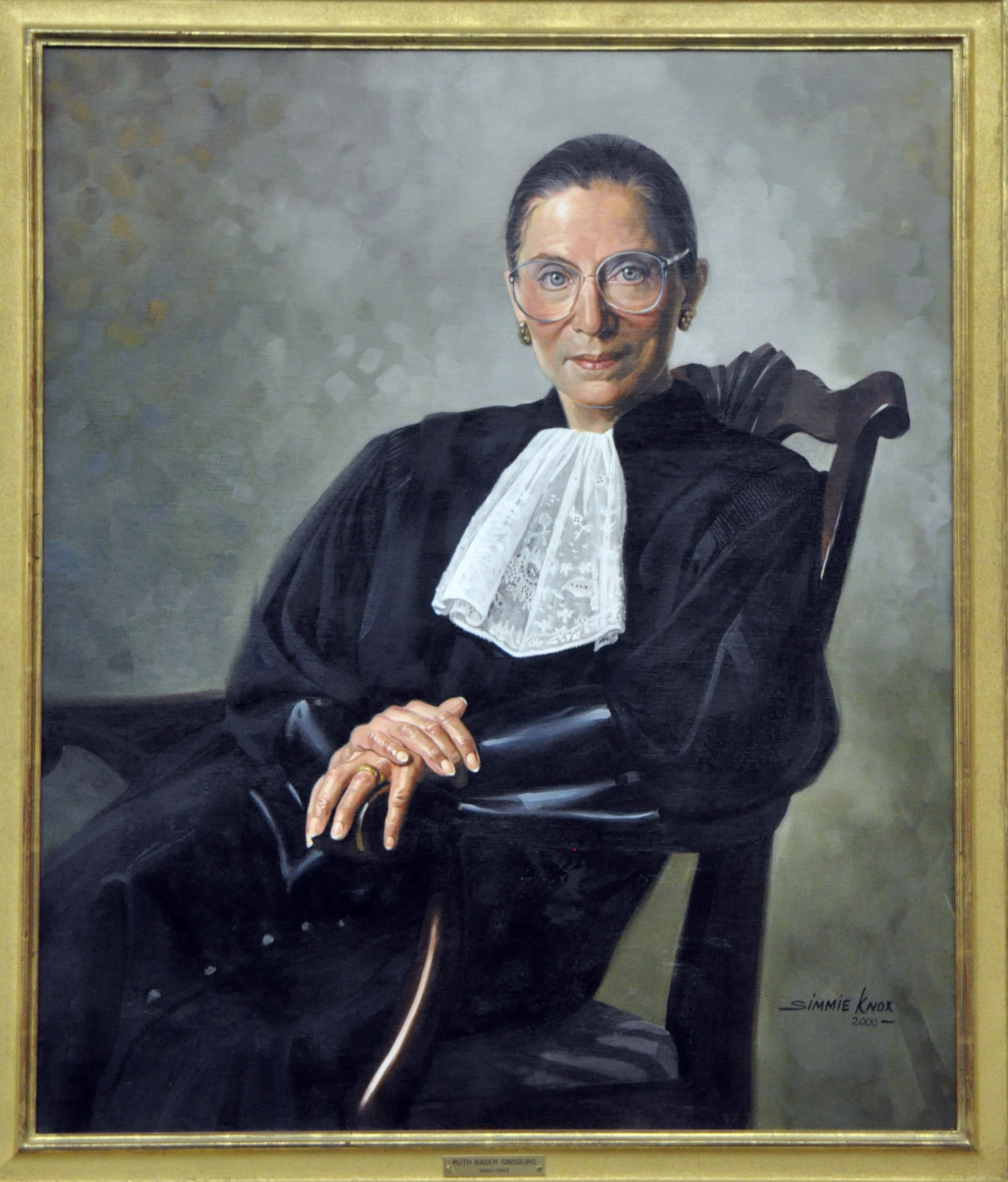
Commissioned portrait by Simmie Knox, 2000

On June 27, 2002, Ginsburg dissented in Board of Education v. Earls which permitted schools to enact mandatory drug testing on students partaking in extracurricular activities. In her dissent, Ginsburg criticized the application of such a policy when the district had failed to identify either a significant drug risk among the students or in the school. In doing so, Ginsburg contrasted the case with Vernonia School District v. Acton which had permitted drug testing due to 'special needs' of athlete participation, acknowledging her prior agreement with the verdict but stating that such an opinion "cannot be read to endorse invasive and suspicionless drug testing of all students".

Although Ginsburg did not author the majority opinion, she was credited with influencing her colleagues on Safford Unified School District v. Redding, 557 U.S. 364 (2009), which held that a school went too far in ordering a 13-year-old female student to strip to her bra and underpants so female officials could search for drugs. In an interview published prior to the Court's decision, Ginsburg shared her view that some of her colleagues did not fully appreciate the effect of a strip search on a 13-year-old girl. As she said, "They have never been a 13-year-old girl." In an 8–1 decision, the Court agreed that the school's search violated the Fourth Amendment and allowed the student's lawsuit against the school to go forward. Only Ginsburg and Stevens would have allowed the student to sue individual school officials as well.

In Herring v. United States, 555 U.S. 135 (2009), Ginsburg dissented from the Court's decision not to suppress evidence due to a police officer's failure to update a computer system. In contrast to Roberts's emphasis on suppression as a means to deter police misconduct, Ginsburg took a more robust view on the use of suppression as a remedy for a violation of a defendant's Fourth Amendment rights. Ginsburg viewed suppression as a way to prevent the government from profiting from mistakes, and therefore as a remedy to preserve judicial integrity and respect civil rights. She also rejected Roberts's assertion that suppression would not deter mistakes, contending making police pay a high price for mistakes would encourage them to take greater care.

On January 26, 2009, Ginsburg wrote for a unanimous court in Arizona v. Johnson that a police officer may pat down an individual at a traffic stop provided reasonable suspicion by the officer the individual was armed and dangerous. In her opinion, Ginsburg concluded that the "combined thrust" of past opinions such as Terry v. Ohio and Pennsylvania v. Mimms provided officers the authority to conduct such a search provided reasonable suspicion of danger by the individual. Additionally, Ginsburg noted that comments made by the officer unrelated to the traffic stop "do not convert the encounter into something other than a lawful seizure, so long as those inquiries do not measurably extend the duration of the stop".

On April 21, 2015, Ginsburg authored the majority opinion in Rodriguez v. United States stating that an officer may not extend the length of a standard traffic stop to conduct a search with a detection dog. In her opinion, Ginsburg stated that the use of a detection dog or any action not related to the initial traffic stop could not be used in suspicion of a separate crime. Ginsburg additionally contended that such an action would only be permissible by the officer provided the officer had "independently supported reasonable suspicion" that a separate crime had occurred at the time of the initial traffic violation and that the action taken would not add additional time to the traffic stop.

==== International law ====
Ginsburg advocated the use of foreign law and norms to shape U.S. law in judicial opinions, a view rejected by some of her conservative colleagues. Ginsburg supported using foreign interpretations of law for persuasive value and possible wisdom, not as binding precedent. Ginsburg expressed the view that consulting international law is a well-ingrained tradition in American law, counting John Henry Wigmore and President John Adams as internationalists. Ginsburg's own reliance on international law dated back to her time as an attorney; in her first argument before the Court, Reed v. Reed, 404 U.S. 71 (1971), she cited two German cases. In her concurring opinion in Grutter v. Bollinger, 539 U.S. 306 (2003), a decision upholding Michigan Law School's affirmative action admissions policy, Ginsburg noted there was accord between the notion that affirmative action admissions policies would have an end point and agrees with international treaties designed to combat racial and gender-based discrimination.

==== Voting rights and affirmative action ====
In 2013, Ginsburg dissented in Shelby County v. Holder, in which the Court held unconstitutional the part of the Voting Rights Act of 1965 requiring federal preclearance before changing voting practices. Ginsburg wrote, "Throwing out preclearance when it has worked and is continuing to work to stop discriminatory changes is like throwing away your umbrella in a rainstorm because you are not getting wet."

Besides Grutter, Ginsburg wrote in favor of affirmative action in her dissent in Gratz v. Bollinger (2003), in which the Court ruled an affirmative action policy unconstitutional because it was not narrowly tailored to the state's interest in diversity. She argued that "government decisionmakers may properly distinguish between policies of exclusion and inclusion...Actions designed to burden groups long denied full citizenship stature are not sensibly ranked with measures taken to hasten the day when entrenched discrimination and its after effects have been extirpated."

==== Native Americans ====
In 1997, Ginsburg wrote the majority opinion in Strate v. A-1 Contractors against tribal jurisdiction over tribal-owned land in a reservation. The case involved a nonmember who caused a car crash in the Mandan, Hidatsa, and Arikara Nation. Ginsburg reasoned that the state right-of-way on which the crash occurred rendered the tribal-owned land equivalent to non-Indian land. She then considered the rule set in Montana v. United States, which allows tribes to regulate the activities of nonmembers who have a relationship with the tribe. Ginsburg noted that the driver's employer did have a relationship with the tribe, but she reasoned that the tribe could not regulate their activities because the victim had no relationship to the tribe. Ginsburg concluded that although "those who drive carelessly on a public highway running through a reservation endanger all in the vicinity, and surely jeopardize the safety of tribal members", having a nonmember go before an "unfamiliar court" was "not crucial to the political integrity, the economic security, or the health or welfare of the Three Affiliated Tribes" (internal quotations and brackets omitted). The decision, by a unanimous Court, was generally criticized by scholars of Indian law, such as David Getches and Frank Pommersheim.

Later in 2005, Ginsburg cited the doctrine of discovery in the majority opinion of City of Sherrill v. Oneida Indian Nation of New York and concluded that the Oneida Indian Nation could not revive its ancient sovereignty over its historic land. The discovery doctrine has been used to grant ownership of Native American lands to colonial governments. The Oneida had lived in towns, grew extensive crops, and maintained trade routes to the Gulf of Mexico. In her opinion for the Court, Ginsburg reasoned that the historic Oneida land had been "converted from wilderness" ever since it was dislodged from the Oneidas' possession. She also reasoned that "the longstanding, distinctly non-Indian character of the area and its inhabitants" and "the regulatory authority constantly exercised by New York State and its counties and towns" justified the ruling. Ginsburg also invoked, sua sponte, the doctrine of laches, reasoning that the Oneidas took a "long delay in seeking judicial relief". She also reasoned that the dispossession of the Oneidas' land was "ancient". Lower courts later relied on Sherrill as precedent to extinguish Native American land claims, including in Cayuga Indian Nation of New York v. Pataki.

Less than a year after Sherrill, Ginsburg offered a starkly contrasting approach to Native American law. In December 2005, Ginsburg dissented in Wagnon v. Prairie Band Potawatomi Nation, arguing that a state tax on fuel sold to Potawatomi retailers would impermissibly nullify the Prairie Band Potawatomi Nation's own tax authority. In 2008, when Ginsburg's precedent in Strate was used in Plains Commerce Bank v. Long Family Land & Cattle Co., she dissented in part and argued that the tribal court of the Cheyenne River Lakota Nation had jurisdiction over the case. In 2020, Ginsburg joined the ruling of McGirt v. Oklahoma, which affirmed Native American jurisdictions over reservations in much of Oklahoma.

==== Other majority opinions ====
In 1999, Ginsburg wrote the majority opinion in Olmstead v. L.C., in which the Court ruled that mental illness is a form of disability covered under the Americans with Disabilities Act of 1990.

In 2000, Ginsburg wrote the majority opinion in Friends of the Earth, Inc. v. Laidlaw Environmental Services, Inc., in which the Court held that residents have standing to seek fines for an industrial polluter that affected their interests and that is able to continue doing so.

=== Decision not to retire under Obama ===
When John Paul Stevens retired in 2010, Ginsburg became the oldest justice on the court at age 77. Despite rumors that she would retire because of advancing age, poor health, and the death of her husband, she denied she was planning to step down. In an interview in August 2010, Ginsburg said her work on the Court was helping her cope with the death of her husband. She also expressed a wish to emulate Justice Louis Brandeis's service of nearly 23 years, which she achieved in April 2016.

Several times during the presidency of Barack Obama, progressive attorneys and activists called for Ginsburg to retire so that Obama could appoint a like-minded successor, particularly while the Democratic Party held control of the U.S. Senate. Ginsburg reaffirmed her wish to remain a justice as long as she was mentally sharp enough to perform her duties. In 2013, Obama met with her in the White House to point out that Democrats might soon lose control of the Senate and nudge her toward stepping down, but she again refused. She opined that Republicans would use the judicial filibuster to prevent Obama from appointing a jurist like herself. She stated that she had a new model to emulate in her former colleague, Justice John Paul Stevens, who retired at the age of 90 after nearly 35 years on the bench.

Lawyer and author Linda Hirshman believed that, in the lead-up to the 2016 U.S. presidential election, Ginsburg was waiting for candidate Hillary Clinton to beat candidate Donald Trump before retiring, as Ginsburg's successor could be nominated by the first female president and Ginsburg also believed that Clinton would nominate a more liberal successor than Obama would. Hirshman even suggested that Ginsburg would have wanted to remain on the court long enough so that Justice Antonin Scalia would be replaced by a liberal; with five liberal justices then Ginsburg would have been the senior liberal in the majority and able to assign all the liberal decisions. After Trump's victory in 2016 and the election of a Republican Senate, she would have had to wait until at least 2021 for a Democrat to be president, but died in office in September 2020 at age 87. In 35 days, Trump and the Republican-controlled Senate led by Mitch McConnell managed to nominate and confirm the conservative Amy Coney Barrett as Ginsburg's successor, right before the 2020 U.S. presidential election in which Trump was defeated by Democratic nominee Joe Biden.

== Other activities ==
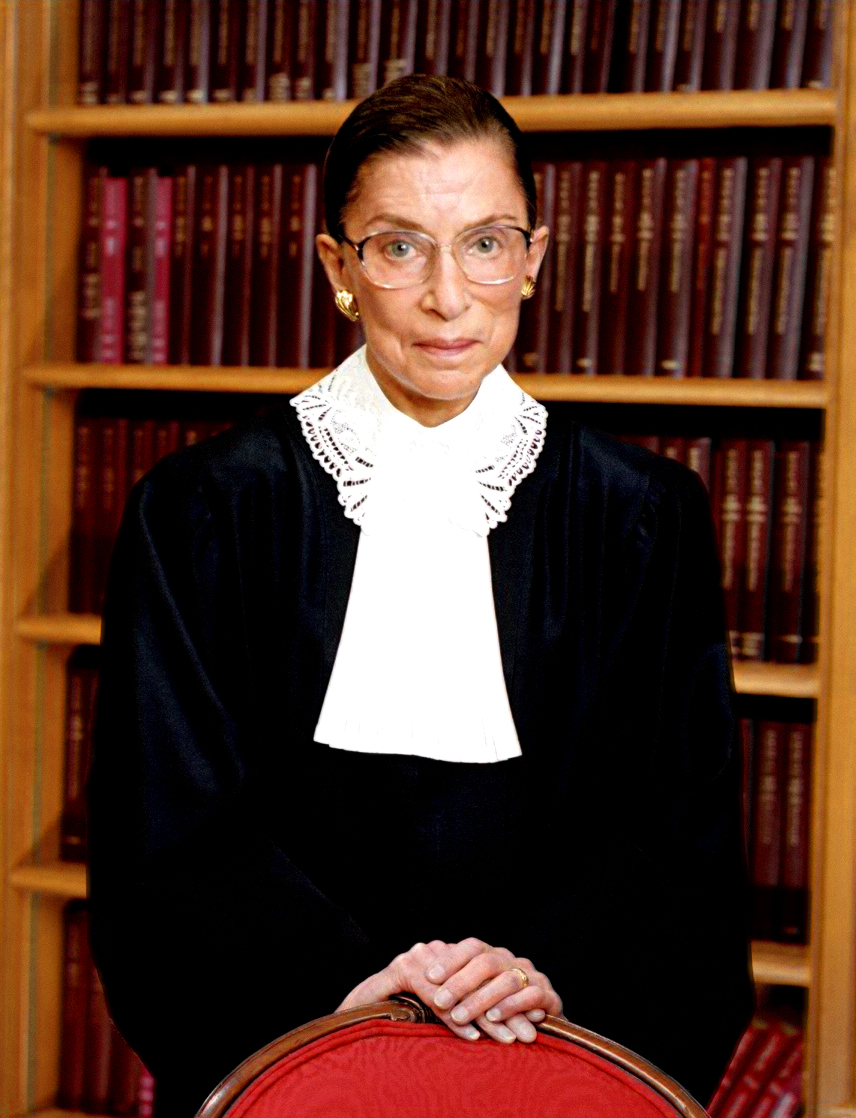
Official portrait, c. 2006

At his request, Ginsburg administered the oath of office to Vice President Al Gore for a second term during the second inauguration of Bill Clinton on January 20, 1997. She was the third woman to administer an inaugural oath of office. Ginsburg is believed to have been the first Supreme Court justice to officiate at a same-sex wedding, performing the August 31, 2013, ceremony of Kennedy Center president Michael Kaiser and John Roberts, a government economist. Earlier that summer, the Court had bolstered same-sex marriage rights in two separate cases. Ginsburg believed that same-sex couples had not asked her to officiate before the issue had been settled, for fear of compromising her ability to hear cases involving gay marriage in the court.

The Supreme Court bar formerly inscribed its certificates "in the year of our Lord", which meant Orthodox Jews who had been admitted to the bar found they were unable to display them, and in 1993 they asked Ginsburg to help them. She did so, and due to her objection, Supreme Court bar members have since been given multiple choices of how to inscribe the year on their certificates.

Despite their ideological differences, Ginsburg considered Antonin Scalia her closest colleague on the Court. The two justices often dined together and attended the opera. In addition to befriending modern composers, including Tobias Picker, in her spare time, Ginsburg appeared in several operas in non-speaking supernumerary roles such as Die Fledermaus (2003) and Ariadne auf Naxos (1994 and 2009 with Scalia), and spoke lines penned by herself in The Daughter of the Regiment (2016).

In January 2012, Ginsburg went to Egypt for four days of discussions with judges, law school faculty, law school students, and legal experts. In an interview with Al Hayat TV, she said the first requirement of a new constitution should be that it would "safeguard basic fundamental human rights like our First Amendment". Asked if Egypt should model its new constitution on those of other nations, she said "I would not look to the U.S. Constitution, if I were drafting a Constitution in the year 2012. I might look at the Constitution of South Africa," noting it's deliberate attempt to construct an independent judiciary which embraced human rights, and remarking how much more recently it had been written than the U.S. constitution. She said Egypt should be "aided by all Constitution-writing that has gone on since the end of World War II". She also praised the U.S. constitution, and said the U.S. was fortunate to have a constitution authored by "very wise" men, but said that in the 1780s, no women were able to participate directly in the process, and slavery still existed in the U.S., adding "The genius of the Constitution, I think, is that it has this notion of who composes 'We the people'. It has expanded and expanded over the years so now it includes people who were left out in the beginning. Native Americans were left out, certainly people held in human bondage, women, and people that were new comers to our shores."

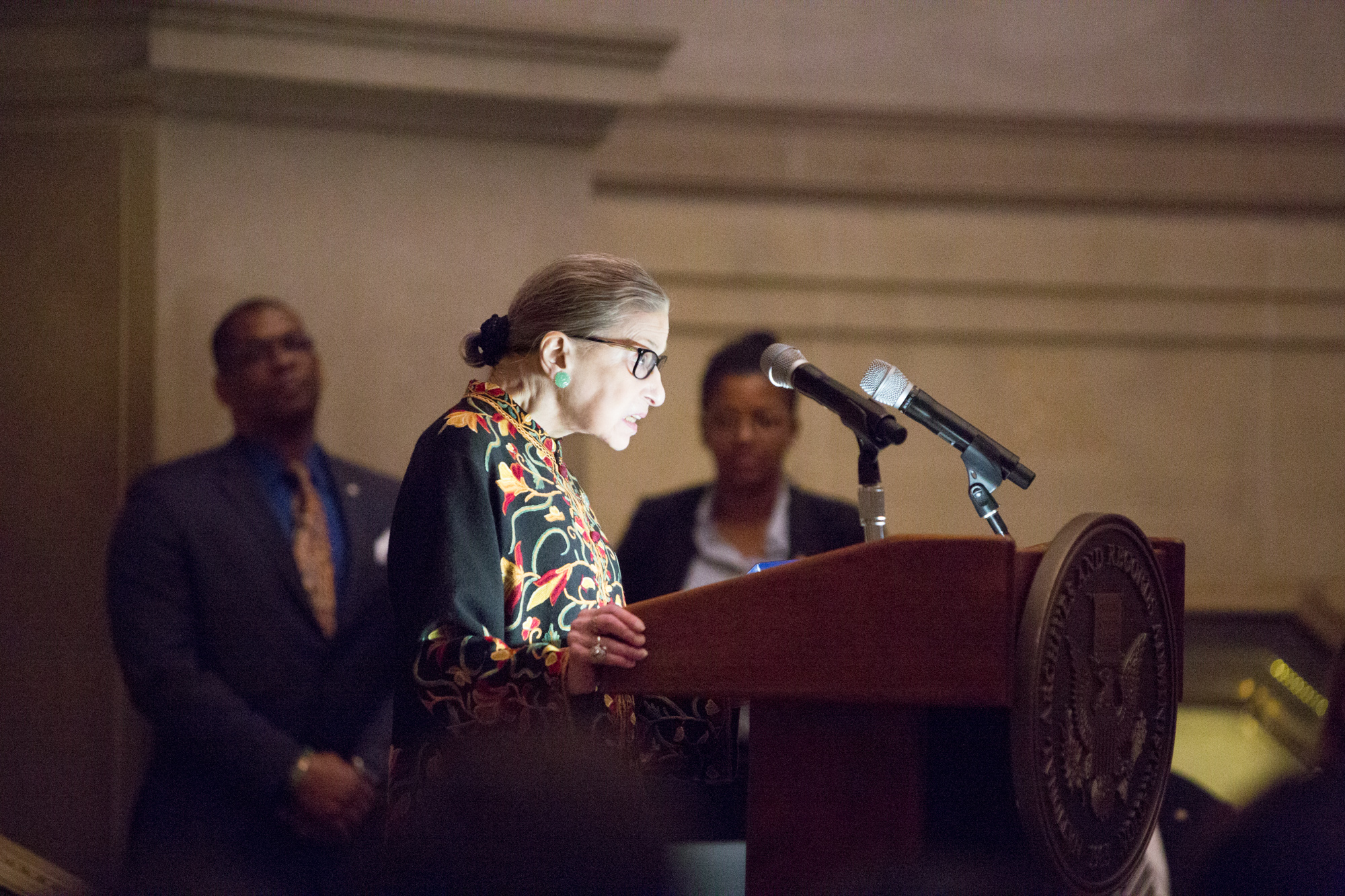
Ginsburg speaking at a naturalization ceremony at the National Archives in 2018

During three interviews in July 2016, Ginsburg criticized presumptive Republican presidential nominee Donald Trump, telling The New York Times and the Associated Press that she did not want to think about the possibility of a Trump presidency. She joked that she might consider moving to New Zealand. She later apologized for commenting on the presumptive Republican nominee, calling her remarks "ill advised".

Ginsburg's first book, My Own Words, was published by Simon & Schuster on October 4, 2016. The book debuted on The New York Times Best Seller List for hardcover nonfiction at No. 12. While promoting her book in October 2016 during an interview with Katie Couric, Ginsburg responded to a question about Colin Kaepernick choosing not to stand for the national anthem at sporting events by calling the protest "really dumb". She later apologized for her criticism calling her earlier comments "inappropriately dismissive and harsh" and noting she had not been familiar with the incident and should have declined to respond to the question. In 2021, Couric revealed that she had edited out some statements by Ginsburg in their interview; Ginsburg said that athletes who protested by not standing were showing "contempt for a government that has made it possible for their parents and grandparents to live a decent life ... which they probably could not have lived in the places they came from."

In 2017, Ginsburg gave the keynote address to a Georgetown University symposium on governmental reform. She spoke on the need for improving the confirmation process, "recall[ing] the 'collegiality' and 'civility' of her own nomination and confirmation..."

In 2018, Ginsburg expressed her support for the MeToo movement, which encourages women to speak up about their experiences with sexual harassment. She told an audience, "It's about time. For so long women were silent, thinking there was nothing you could do about it, but now the law is on the side of women, or men, who encounter harassment and that's a good thing." She also reflected on her own experiences with gender discrimination and sexual harassment, including a time when a chemistry professor at Cornell unsuccessfully attempted to trade her exam answers for sex.

== Personal life ==
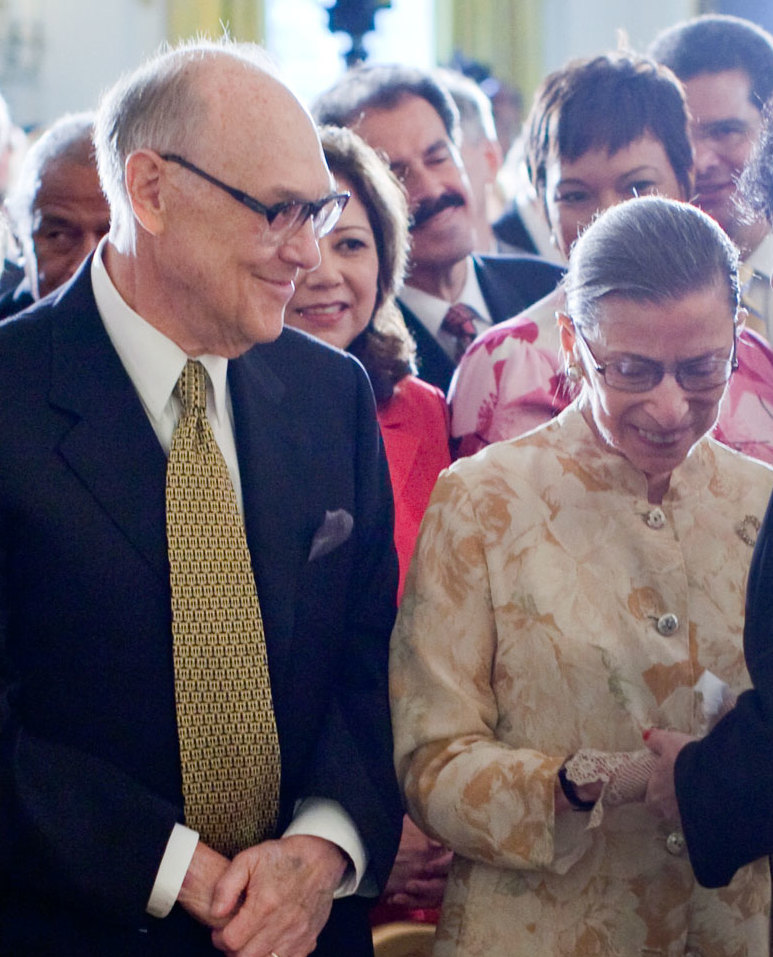
Martin and Ruth Bader Ginsburg at a White House event, 2009

A few days after Ruth Bader graduated from Cornell, she married Martin D. Ginsburg, who later became an internationally prominent tax attorney practising at Weil, Gotshal & Manges. Upon Ruth Bader Ginsburg's accession to the D.C. Circuit, the couple moved from New York City to Washington, D.C., where Martin became a professor of law at Georgetown University Law Center. The couple's daughter, Jane C. Ginsburg (born 1955), is a professor at Columbia Law School. Their son, James Steven Ginsburg (born 1965), is the founder and president of Cedille Records, a classical music recording company based in Chicago, Illinois. Martin and Ruth had four grandchildren.

After the birth of their daughter, Martin was diagnosed with testicular cancer. During this period, Ruth attended class and took notes for both of them, typing her husband's dictated papers and caring for their daughter and her sick husband. During this period, she also was selected to be a member of the Harvard Law Review. Martin died of complications from metastatic cancer on June 27, 2010, four days after their 56th wedding anniversary. They spoke publicly of being in a shared earning/shared parenting marriage including in a speech Martin wrote and had intended to give before his death that Ruth delivered posthumously.

Ruth Bader Ginsburg was a non-observant Jew, attributing this to gender inequality in Jewish prayer ritual and relating it to her mother's death. However, she said she might have felt differently if she were younger, and she was pleased that Reform and Conservative Judaism were becoming more egalitarian in this regard. In March 2015, Ginsburg and Rabbi Lauren Holtzblatt released "The Heroic and Visionary Women of Passover", an essay highlighting the roles of five key women in the saga. The text states, "These women had a vision leading out of the darkness shrouding their world. They were women of action, prepared to defy authority to make their vision a reality bathed in the light of the day ..." In addition, she decorated her chambers with an artist's rendering of the Hebrew phrase from Deuteronomy, "Zedek, zedek, tirdof," ("Justice, justice shall you pursue") as a reminder of her heritage and professional responsibility.

Ginsburg had a collection of lace jabots from around the world. She said in 2014 she had a particular jabot she wore when issuing her dissents (black with gold embroidery and faceted stones) as well as another she wore when issuing majority opinions (crocheted yellow and cream with crystals), which was a gift from her law clerks. Her favorite jabot (woven with white beads) was from Cape Town, South Africa.

=== Health ===
In 1999, Ginsburg was diagnosed with colon cancer, the first of her five bouts with cancer. She underwent surgery followed by chemotherapy and radiation therapy. During the process, she did not miss a day on the bench. Ginsburg was physically weakened by the cancer treatment, and she began working with a personal trainer. Bryant Johnson, a former Army reservist attached to the U.S. Army Special Forces, trained Ginsburg twice weekly in the justices-only gym at the Supreme Court. Ginsburg saw her physical fitness improve after her first bout with cancer; she was able to complete twenty push-ups in a session before her 80th birthday.

Nearly a decade after her first bout with cancer, Ginsburg again underwent surgery on February 5, 2009, this time for pancreatic cancer. She had a tumor that was discovered at an early stage. She was released from a New York City hospital on February 13, 2009, and returned to the bench when the Supreme Court went back into session on February 23, 2009. After experiencing discomfort while exercising in the Supreme Court gym in November 2014, she had a stent placed in her right coronary artery.

Ginsburg's next hospitalization helped her detect another round of cancer. On November 8, 2018, Ginsburg fell in her office at the Supreme Court, fracturing three ribs, for which she was hospitalized. An outpouring of public support followed. Although the day after her fall, Ginsburg's nephew revealed she had already returned to official judicial work after a day of observation, a CT scan of her ribs following her fall showed cancerous nodules in her lungs. On December 21, Ginsburg underwent a left-lung lobectomy at Memorial Sloan Kettering Cancer Center to remove the nodules. For the first time since joining the Court more than 25 years earlier, Ginsburg missed oral argument on January 7, 2019, while she recuperated. She returned to the Supreme Court on February 15, 2019, to participate in a private conference with other justices in her first appearance at the Court since her cancer surgery in December 2018.

Months later in August 2019, the Supreme Court announced that Ginsburg had recently completed three weeks of focused radiation treatment to ablate a tumor found in her pancreas over the summer. By January 2020, Ginsburg was cancer-free. By February 2020, the cancer had returned but this news was not released to the public. However, by May 2020, Ginsburg was once again receiving treatment for a recurrence of cancer. She reiterated her position that she "would remain a member of the Court as long as I can do the job full steam", adding that she remained fully able to do so.

== Death and succession ==
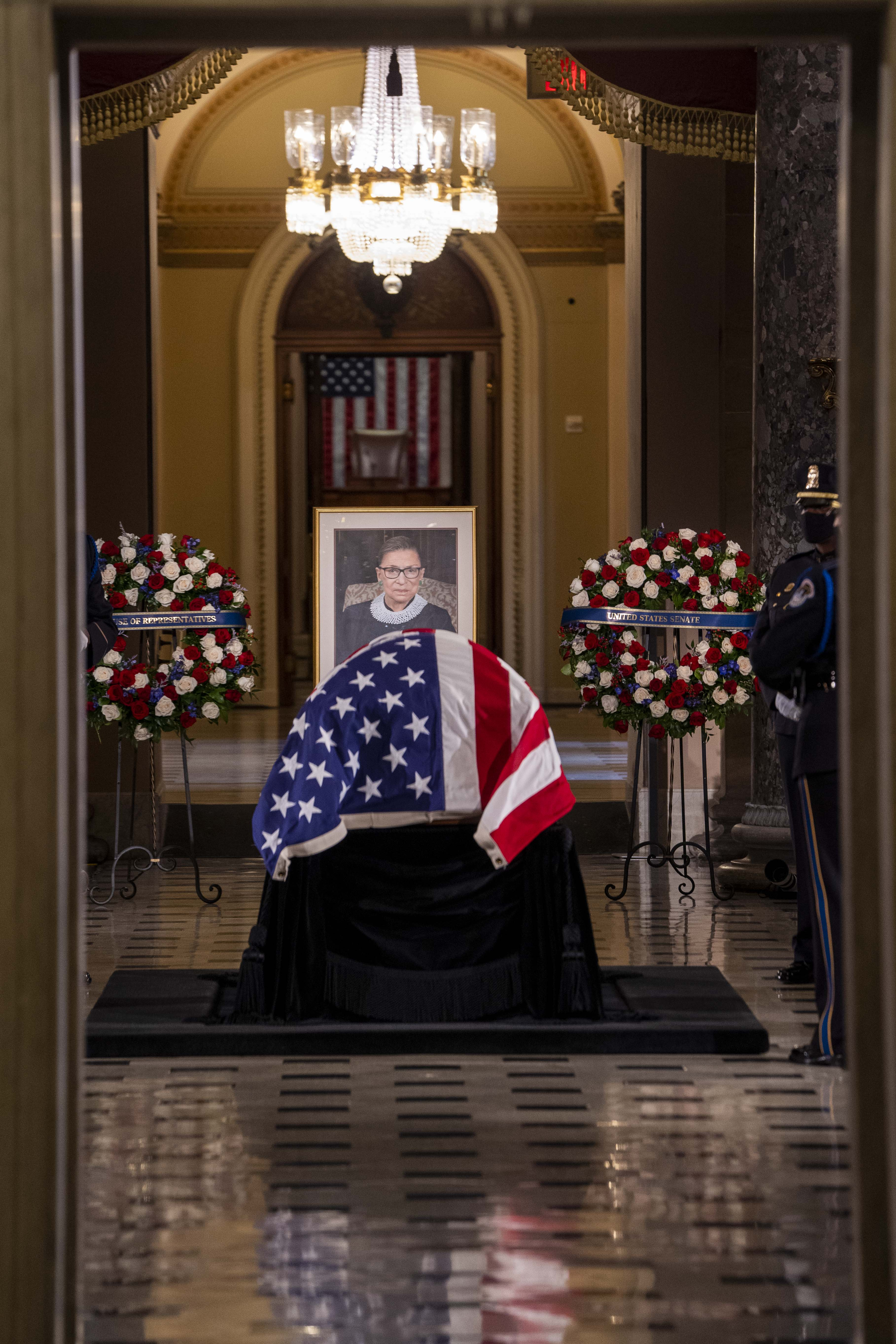
Ginsburg was honored in a ceremony in Statuary Hall, and was the first woman to lie in state at the Capitol, September 25, 2020.

Ginsburg died from complications of metastatic pancreatic cancer on September 18, 2020, at age 87. She died on the eve of Rosh Hashanah, and according to Rabbi Richard Jacobs, "One of the themes of Rosh Hashanah suggest that very righteous people would die at the very end of the year because they were needed until the very end". After the announcement of her death, thousands of people gathered in front of the Supreme Court building to lay flowers, light candles, and leave messages.

Five days after her death, the eight Supreme Court justices, Ginsburg's children, and other family members held a private ceremony for Ginsburg in the Court's great hall. Following the private ceremony, due to COVID-19 pandemic conditions prohibiting the usual lying in repose in the great hall, Ginsburg's casket was moved outdoors to the Court's west portico so the public could pay respects. Thousands of mourners lined up to walk past the casket over the course of two days.

After the two days in repose at the Court, Ginsburg lay in state at the Capitol. She was the first woman and first Jew to lie in state therein. (Note: Rosa Parks was the first woman to lie in honor at the U.S. Capitol in 2005.) On September 29, Ginsburg was buried beside her husband in Arlington National Cemetery.

Ginsburg's death opened a vacancy on the Supreme Court about six weeks before the 2020 presidential election, initiating controversies regarding the nomination and confirmation of her successor. Days before her death, Ginsburg dictated a statement to her granddaughter Clara Spera, as heard by Ginsburg's doctor and others in the room at the time: "My most fervent wish is that I will not be replaced until a new president is installed." Her wish was not honored, as President Trump's pick to replace her, Amy Coney Barrett, was confirmed by the Senate and sworn in on October 26.

== Recognition ==
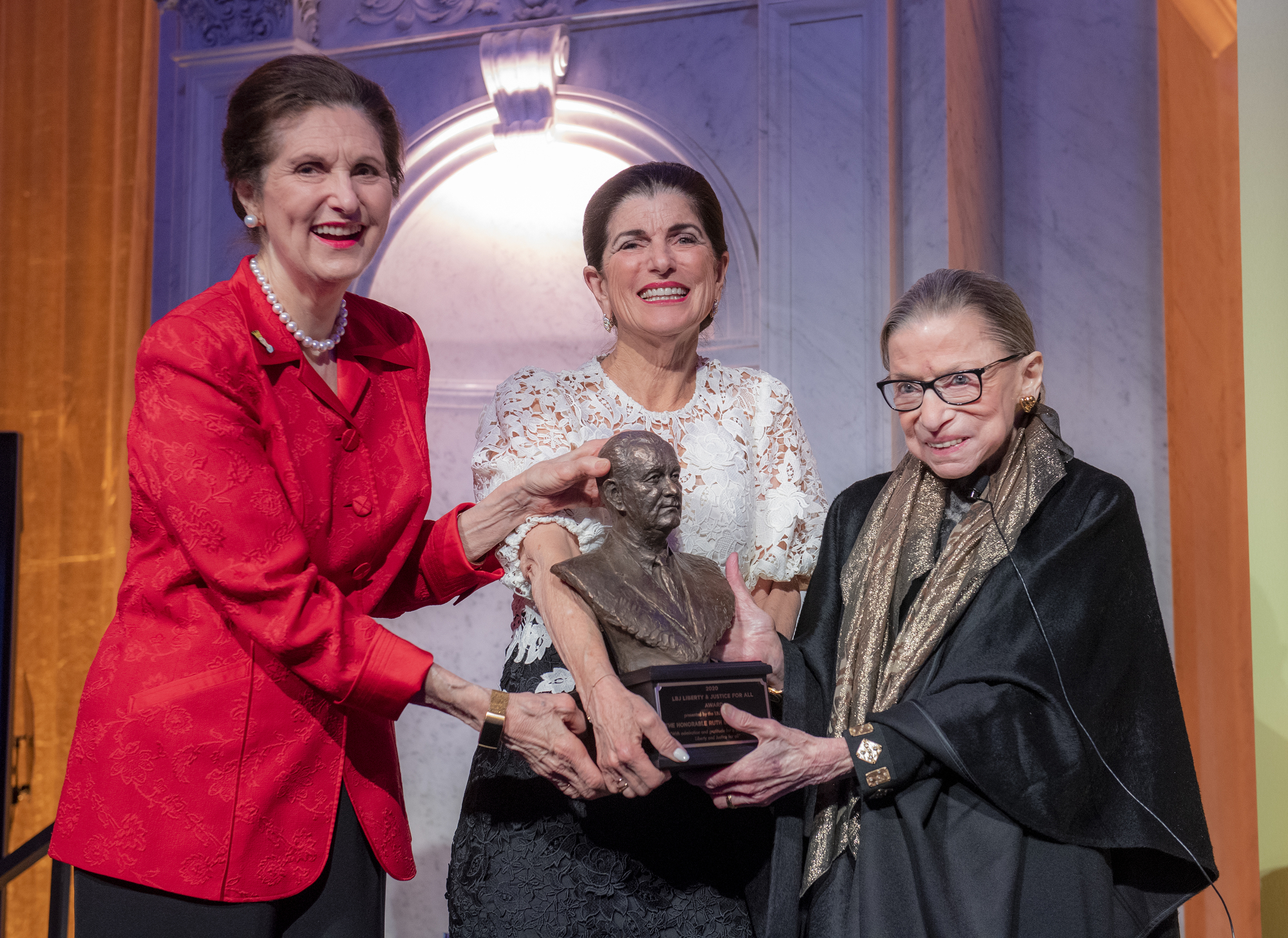
Ginsburg receiving the LBJ Liberty & Justice for All Award from Lynda Johnson Robb and Luci Baines Johnson at the Library of Congress in January 2020

In 2002, Ginsburg was inducted into the National Women's Hall of Fame. Ginsburg was named one of 100 Most Powerful Women (2009), one of Glamour magazine's Women of the Year 2012, and one of Time magazine's 100 most influential people (2015). She was awarded honorary degrees by Lund University (1969), American University Law School (1981), Vermont Law School (1984), Georgetown University (1985), DePaul University (1985), Brooklyn Law School (1987), Hebrew Union College (1988), Rutgers University (1990), Amherst College (1990), Lewis & Clark College (1992), Columbia University (1994), Long Island University (1994), New York University (1994), Smith College (1994), the University of Illinois (1994), Brandeis University (1996), George Washington University (1997), Jewish Theological Seminary of America (1997), Wheaton College (Massachusetts) (1997), Northwestern University (1998), University of Michigan (2001), Brown University (2002), Yale University (2003), John Jay College of Criminal Justice (2004), Johns Hopkins University (2004), University of Pennsylvania (2007), Willamette University (2009), Princeton University (2010), Harvard University (2011), and the State University of New York (2019).

In 2009, Ginsburg received a Lifetime Achievement Award from Scribes—The American Society of Legal Writers.

In 2013, a painting featuring the four female justices to have served as justices on the Supreme Court (Ginsburg, Sandra Day O'Connor, Sonia Sotomayor, and Elena Kagan) was unveiled at the Smithsonian's National Portrait Gallery in Washington, D.C.

In 2018 Ginsburg was the inaugural recipient of the Genesis Lifetime Achievement Award.

Ginsburg was the recipient of the 2019 $1 million Berggruen Prize for Philosophy and Culture, which is awarded annually by the US think tank the Berggruen Institute. This award recognizes "thinkers whose ideas have profoundly shaped human self-understanding and advancement in a rapidly changing world", noting Ginsburg as "a lifelong trailblazer for human rights and gender equality". Ginsburg donated the entirety of the prize money to charitable and non-profit organizations, including the Malala Fund, Hand in Hand: Center for Jewish-Arab Education in Israel, the American Bar Foundation, Memorial Sloan Kettering Cancer Center, and the Washington Concert Opera.

Also in 2019, the Skirball Cultural Center in Los Angeles created Notorious RBG: The Life and Times of Ruth Bader Ginsburg, a large-scale exhibition focusing on Ginsburg's life and career.

In 2019, Time created 89 new covers to celebrate women of the year starting from 1920; it chose Ginsburg for 1996.

In February 2020, she received the World Peace & Liberty Award from the World Jurist Association and the World Law Foundation, their highest honor.

Ginsburg received numerous additional awards, including the LBJ Foundation's Liberty & Justice for All Award; a lifetime achievement award from Diane von Furstenberg's foundation, and the 2020 Liberty Medal by the National Constitution Center, all in 2020 alone.

=== Legacy ===
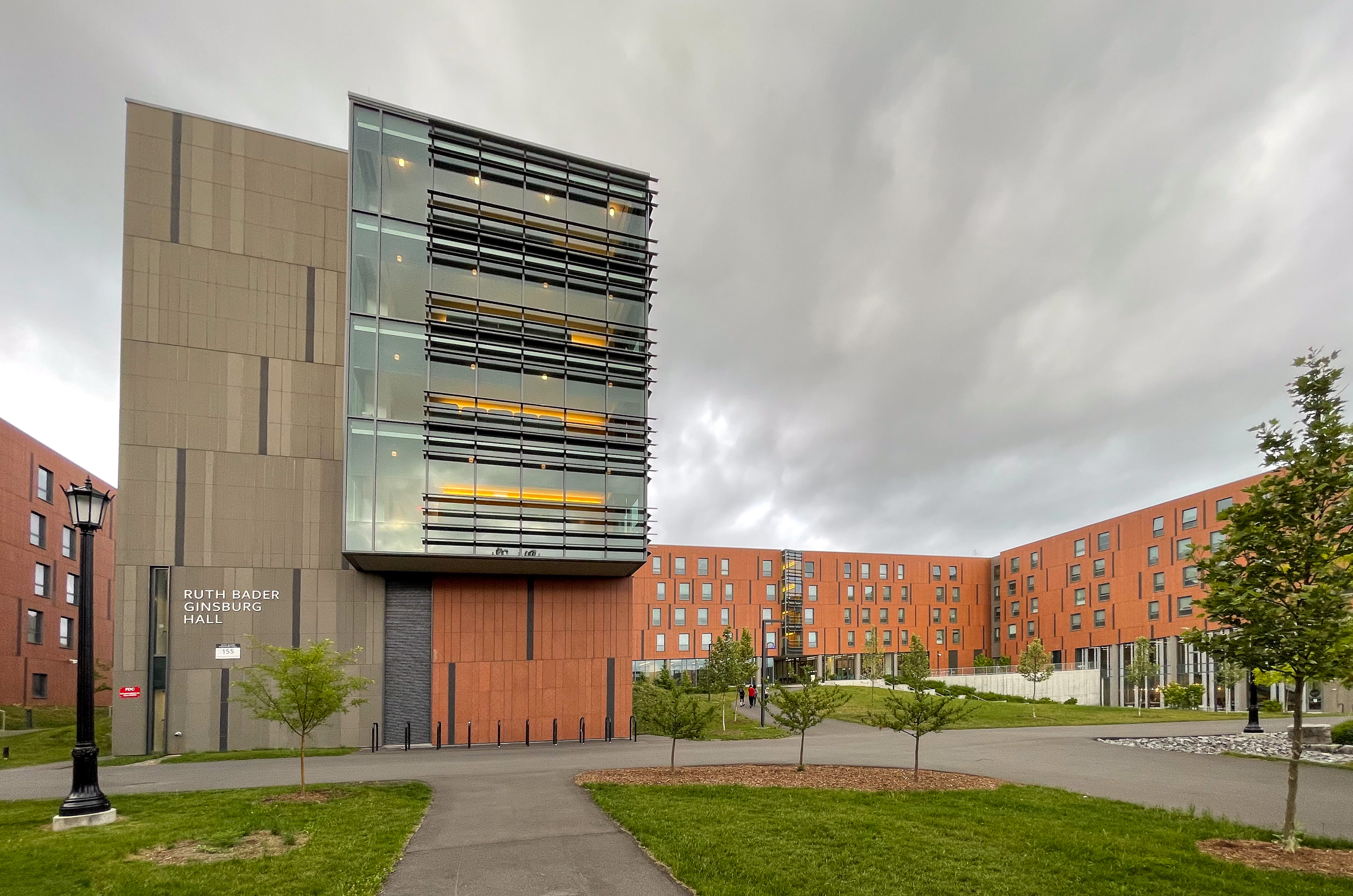
Ruth Bader Ginsburg Hall at Cornell University

In 2016, researchers at the Cleveland Museum of Natural History gave a species of praying mantis the name Ilomantis ginsburgae after Ginsburg. The name was given because the neck plate of the Ilomantis ginsburgae bears a resemblance to a jabot, which Ginsburg was known for wearing. Moreover, the new species was identified based upon the female insect's genitalia instead of based upon the male of the species. The researchers noted that the name was a nod to Ginsburg's fight for gender equality.

In 2019 the Dwight D. Opperman Foundation established the Ruth Bader Ginsburg Woman of Leadership Award in honour of Ginsburg, with her input into establishing the award criteria. Ginsburg presented the first award in February 2020 to arts patron and philanthropist Agnes Gund. After being presented to women in 2021–2023, the organization changed its award guidelines in 2024, with four of the five awards going to men, including Elon Musk and Rupert Murdoch. Ginsburg's family distanced itself from the award and asked for her name to be removed from it. The awards were not given.

The Ruth Bader Ginsburg Medal, established by the World Jurist Association, was first presented in 2021. It aims to recognise prominent female jurists, and several awards are given each year.

The U.S. Navy announced on March 31, 2022, that it will name one of its John Lewis-class replenishment oilers the USNS Ruth Bader Ginsburg.

In August 2022, Ruth Bader Ginsburg Hall, a residence hall at Cornell University, opened its doors to the Class of 2026.

An elementary school in Chicago was named to honor her in 2024.

In March 2023, a special memorial session of the Supreme Court honored Ginsburg. Also in 2023, Ginsburg was featured on a USPS Forever stamp. The stamp was designed by art director Ethel Kessler, using an oil painting by Michael J. Deas based on a photograph by Philip Bermingham.

In May 2023, Ruth Bader Ginsburg Hospital, New York City's first new public hospital in over 40 years opened in her native borough of Brooklyn. It houses a 7 ft (2.1 m) tall bronze statue of her in the new building's lobby.

== In popular culture ==
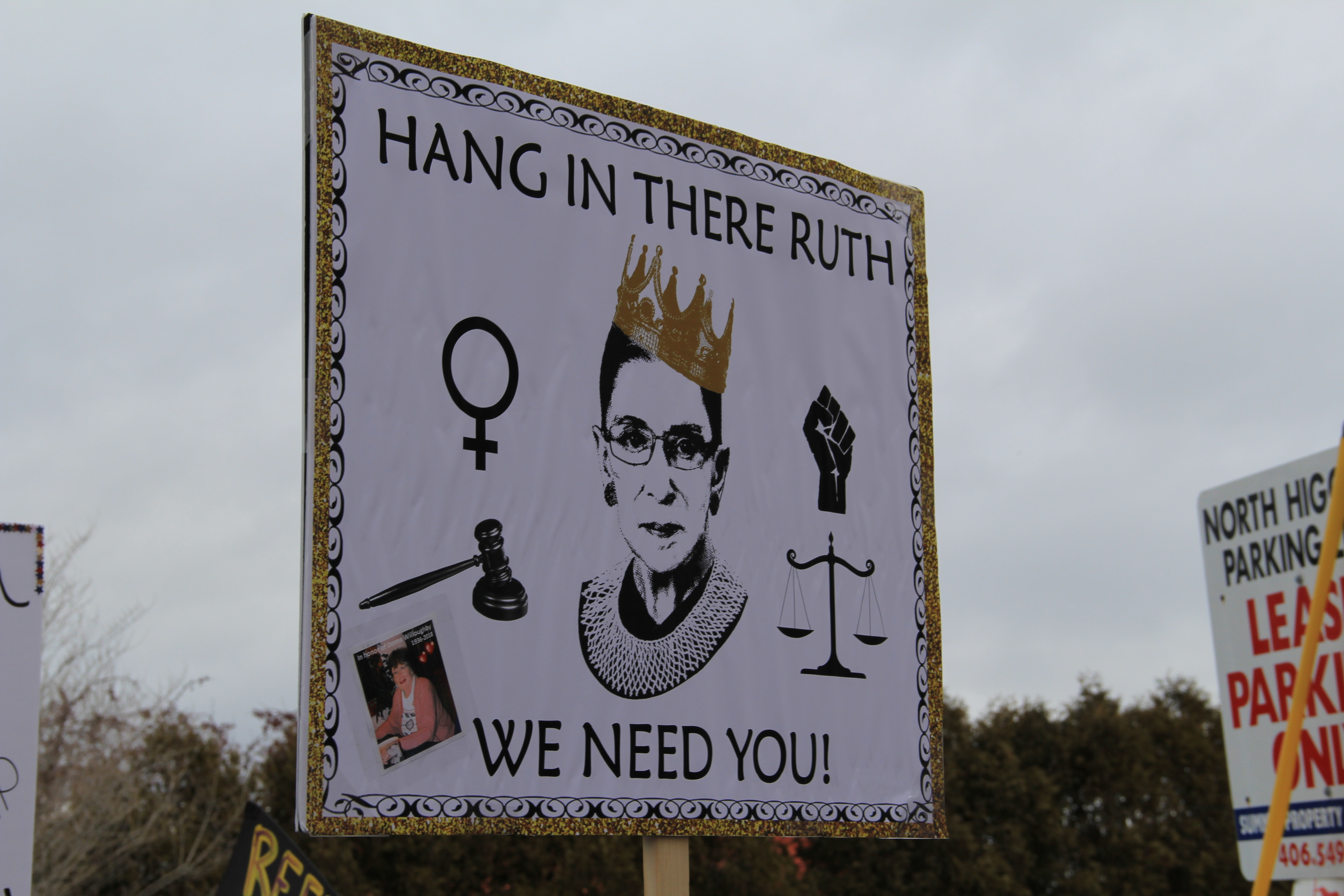
A poster depicting Ginsburg as "the Notorious R.B.G." in the likeness of American rapper the Notorious B.I.G., 2018

Ginsburg has been referred to as a "pop culture icon" and also an "American cultural icon". Ginsburg's profile began to rise after O'Connor's retirement in 2006 left Ginsburg as the only serving female justice. Her increasingly fiery dissents, particularly in Shelby County v. Holder, led to the creation of a sobriquet, "the Notorious R.B.G." (a takeoff on the name of a rap star, the Notorious B.I.G.), which became an internet meme after starting on Tumblr. The Tumblr blogger who coined the meme, law student Shana Knizhnik, teamed up with MSNBC reporter Irin Carmon to turn the contents of the blog into a book titled Notorious RBG: The Life and Times of Ruth Bader Ginsburg. Published in October 2015, the book became a New York Times bestseller. In 2016, the progressive magazine Current Affairs criticized Ginsburg's status as an icon of progressivism, noting that her voting record was significantly more moderate than deceased justices Thurgood Marshall, William J. Brennan Jr., and William O. Douglas, and that she often sided with law enforcement in qualified immunity cases.

Additionally, Ginsburg's pop culture appeal has inspired nail art, Halloween costumes, a bobblehead doll, tattoos, t-shirts, coffee mugs, and a children's coloring book among other things. She appears in both a comic opera and a workout book. Musician Jonathan Mann also made a song using part of her Burwell v. Hobby Lobby Stores, Inc. dissent. Ginsburg admitted to having a "large supply" of Notorious R.B.G. t-shirts, which she distributed as gifts.

Since 2015, Kate McKinnon has portrayed Ginsburg on Saturday Night Live. McKinnon has repeatedly reprised the role, including during a Weekend Update sketch that aired from the 2016 Republican National Convention in Cleveland. The segments typically feature McKinnon (as Ginsburg) lobbing insults she calls "Ginsburns" and doing a celebratory dance. Filmmakers Betsy West and Julie Cohen created a documentary about Ginsburg, titled RBG, for CNN Films, which premiered at the 2018 Sundance Film Festival. In the film Deadpool 2 (2018), a photo of her is shown as Deadpool considers her for his X-Force, a team of superheroes. Another film, On the Basis of Sex, focusing on Ginsburg's career struggles fighting for equal rights, was released later in 2018; its screenplay was named to the Black List of best unproduced screenplays of 2014. English actress Felicity Jones portrays Ginsburg in the film, with Armie Hammer as her husband Marty. Ginsburg herself has a cameo in the film. The seventh season of the sitcom New Girl features a three-year-old character named Ruth Bader Schmidt, named after Ginsburg. A Lego mini-figurine of Ginsburg is shown within a brief segment of The Lego Movie 2. Ginsburg gave her blessing for the cameo, as well as to have the mini-figurine produced as part of the Lego toy sets following the film's release in February 2019. Also in 2019, Samuel Adams released a limited-edition beer called When There Are Nine, referring to Ginsburg's well-known reply to the question about when there would be enough women on the Supreme Court.

In the sitcom The Good Place, the "craziest secret celebrity hookup" was Ginsburg and Canadian rapper Drake, whom protagonist Tahani reveals she set up as a "perfect couple".

Sisters in Law (2015), a book by Linda Hirshman, follows the careers and judicial records of Sandra Day O'Connor and Ginsburg.

In 2018, Ginsburg appeared on The Late Show with Stephen Colbert, which featured her following her regular workout routine accompanied by Stephen Colbert joking with her and attempting to perform the same routine. She also answered a few questions and weighed in on the famous internet question and ongoing debate "Is a hot dog a sandwich?" She ultimately ruled that, based on Colbert's definition of a sandwich, a hot dog is a sandwich.

In 2015, Ginsburg and Scalia, known for their shared love of opera, were fictionalized in Scalia/Ginsburg, an opera by Derrick Wang broadcast on national radio on November 7, 2020. The opera was introduced before Ginsburg and Scalia at the Supreme Court in 2013, and Ginsburg attended the 2015 Castleton Festival world premiere as well as a revised version at the 2017 Glimmerglass Festival. Ginsburg, who with Scalia wrote forewords to Wang's libretto, included excerpts from the opera as a chapter in her book My Own Words, quoted it in her official statement on Scalia's death, and spoke about it frequently. Francesca Zambello of the Washington National Opera recalled "She loved Wagner’s Götterdämmerung, and its finale, the Immolation Scene. We had a lot of conversations about Brünnhilde, and why it took a woman to save the world. That’s what she said: Only a woman could do it; only a woman could change the course of history." Of Ginsburg's love of the medium, Zambello says "Her life was about understanding people’s stories, and that’s what we do."

In the 2020 television mini-series Mrs. America she is portrayed by Tara Nicodemo.

== See also ==
- Bill Clinton Supreme Court candidates § Ruth Bader Ginsburg nomination
- List of justices of the Supreme Court of the United States
- List of law clerks for the sixth seat of the Supreme Court of the United States
- List of U.S. Supreme Court cases during the Rehnquist Court
- List of U.S. Supreme Court cases during the Roberts Court
- List of United States Supreme Court justices by time in office
- List of Jewish United States Supreme Court justices
- RBG PAC

== Notes ==
Legal offices
Preceded by Harold Leventhal	Judge of the United States Court of Appeals for the District of Columbia Circuit; 1980–1993	Succeeded by David Tatel
Preceded by Byron White	Associate Justice of the Supreme Court of the United States; 1993–2020	Succeeded by Amy Coney Barrett
Honorary titles
Preceded by John Lewis	Persons who have lain in state or honor in the United States Capitol rotunda September 25, 2020	Succeeded by Brian Sicknick
