= Sisters in Law =

Sisters in Law may refer to:

- Sibling-in-law, a person related to another by being the sibling of a spouse or the spouse of a sibling
- Sisters in Law (film), a 2005 documentary film
- Sisters in Law (book), a 2015 book by Linda R. Hirshman
- "Sister in Law" (Everybody Loves Raymond episode), episode 13 of season 9
- Sisters-in-Law (TV series), a 2017 South Korean television series.
