= James Steven Ginsburg =

American music producer (born 1965)

- Born: September 8, 1965 (age 60); Washington, D.C., U.S.
- Education: University of Chicago (BA)
- Occupation: Music producer
- Spouses: Lisa Brauston (m. 1995; div. 2009) Patrice Michaels Bedi (m. 2010)
- Children: 2
- Parents: Martin D. Ginsburg (father); Ruth Bader Ginsburg (mother)
- Relatives: Jane C. Ginsburg (sister)

James Steven Ginsburg (born September 8, 1965) is an American music producer. He is founder and president of Cedille Records, a classical label he launched in 1989 while a student at the University of Chicago. He is the son of former United States Supreme Court justice Ruth Bader Ginsburg.

== Background ==
Ginsburg was born into a family of lawyers. His mother, Ruth Bader Ginsburg, was appointed to the U.S. Supreme Court by President Bill Clinton in 1993. His father, Martin D. Ginsburg, taught at Georgetown University Law Center. His older sister, Jane, teaches law at Columbia University.

He attended The Dalton School, Georgetown Day School in Washington, D.C., and the University of Chicago where he received his Bachelor of Arts degree in 1987, and attended its Law School for one and a half years.

== Cedille Records ==
Ginsburg was raised in New York City's Upper East Side, where he began collecting classical music recordings at an early age. While attending the University of Chicago, he managed classical programming at the university's mixed-format radio station, WHPK. Before his undergraduate graduation, he began reviewing classical recordings for American Record Guide magazine.

In 1989, Ginsburg launched a record label, Cedille Records, to record classical music produced by artists and composers in Chicago. The label is based in the Edgewater neighborhood of the city. Encouraged by the critical and commercial response to his early recordings, Ginsburg abandoned law school in his second year to devote himself full-time to Cedille.

In 1994, Cedille became a not-for-profit under the umbrella of an operating foundation, now called Cedille Chicago, NFP (formerly The Chicago Classical Recording Foundation). This change gave Cedille the ability to produce more recordings and pursue more ambitious projects. Cedille Records releases an average of eight recordings per year.

== Professional recognition ==
In 2009, the Chicago Tribune nominated Ginsburg as "Chicagoan of the Year," writing, "Let's hear it for James Ginsburg. The Chicagoan is one of the last independent entrepreneurs in classical recording, a man who has stuck to his artistic vision and made a success of it at a time of market shrinkage and industry downsizing."

In 2010, Ginsburg won the Helen Coburn Meier and Tim Meier Charitable Foundation for the Arts Achievement Award. In making the award, the Foundation wrote, "We applaud Jim for seeing that Chicago has an abundance of stellar musicians. With his recording projects, Jim believes he can advance musicians' careers and serve the listening public in equal measure."

Additional recognition and awards include being named a Jewish Chicagoan of the Year by the Chicago Jewish News in 2011; in 2012, he received the Ruth D. and Ken M. Davee Excellence in the Arts Award from the Illinois Philharmonic Orchestra; in 2016, Musical America named him one of The Top 30 Performing Arts Professionals of the Year; and in 2017, he was the honoree at the annual galas of both Chicago Opera Theater and the Rembrandt Chamber Musicians. Most recently, he received a 2020 Distinguished Service to the Arts Award from Lawyers for the Creative Arts.

In 2019, Ginsburg was nominated for a “Producer of the Year, Classical” Grammy Award. In addition to this nomination, Cedille Records albums have won a number of Grammys, including the 2008, 2012, 2013, 2016 Awards for "Best Small Ensemble/Chamber Music Performance" for the contemporary music sextet Eighth Blackbird. In 2017, Third Coast Percussion also won for “Best Small Ensemble/Chamber Music Performance" for its Cedille album of music by composer Steve Reich.

As Slate notes about Cedille, "Today it’s one of the most-respected labels in the space, with six Grammy-winning records and 18 Grammy nominations."

== Personal life ==
In 1995, Ginsburg married Lisa Brauston of Shaker Heights, Ohio; the ceremony was officiated by his mother. Brauston is an art historian. After their divorce, he married opera singer, composer, and professor of voice, Patrice Michaels, in 2010. Ginsburg has two children from his first marriage.
