= Beethoven Project Trio =

The Beethoven Project Trio is an American piano trio that was formed in Chicago in 2008. Its founding members are pianist George Lepauw, violinist Sang Mee Lee and cellist Wendy Warner. The first public concert given by the trio was on March 1, 2009 at Chicago’s Murphy Auditorium for the world premiere of a recently rediscovered piano trio by (Hess 47) Ludwig van Beethoven, as well as the American premiere of another Beethoven trio (Anhang 3) and the Chicago premiere of yet another Trio (Opus 63); the performance also included the well-known “Archduke” Trio by Beethoven. John von Rhein, music critic of the Chicago Tribune, wrote about the trio's first concert that "for musicians who had never worked together as a trio before, pianist George Lepauw, violinist Sang Mee Lee and cellist Wendy Warner made a splendid ensemble, playing with finely judged balance, evenness of sound and unanimity of style [...] Lepauw, Lee and Warner ended their program with Beethoven’s familiar “Archduke” Trio, a masterpiece that drew fully on their individual and collective abilities. The slow movement emerged with particular eloquence here."

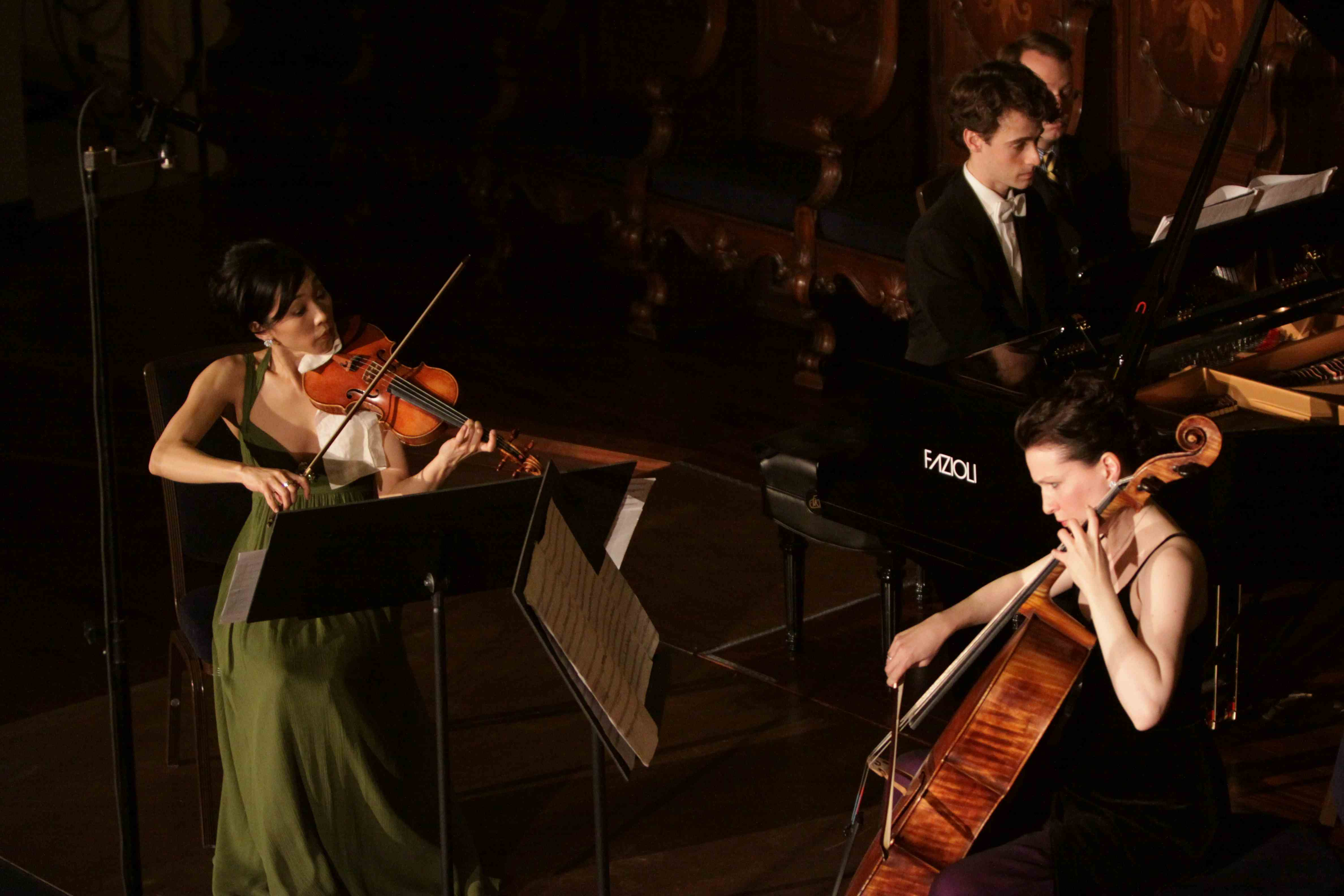
The Beethoven Project Trio in performance, March 1, 2009

The Beethoven Project Trio is one of the performing ensembles (along with the Beethoven Project Chamber Players) of an umbrella organization, the International Beethoven Project, which organized the trio's world premiere Beethoven performance in March 2009 and co-produced their recording along with Cedille Records. The International Beethoven Project is a not-for-profit organization headquartered in Chicago.

== Purpose of the group ==
The purpose of the Beethoven Project Trio is to explore all of Beethoven's trio works and to approach them within the context of Beethoven's complete output and life-story. On occasion, the group will explore the trio repertoire by other composers who either inspired or were inspired by Beethoven. Of interest to the group is also the occasional commission of a new piano trio.

The Beethoven Project Trio also has a strong educational mission, which the group fulfills by giving performances in schools, giving lectures, and master classes.

When possible, the group supports charities by donating performances or by helping to raise awareness of important issues that help to make the world better, in the spirit of Beethoven's own care for humanity.

== Discography ==
The Beethoven Project Trio made the world-premiere recording of Beethoven's Piano Trio in E flat Major, Hess 47, along with Beethoven's Opus 63 and his Piano Trio in D Major, Kinsky/Halm Anhang 3 in an edition by Robert McConnell. The recording took place in New York at the American Academy of Arts and Letters, with Max Wilcox producing for the Chicago-based Cedille Records label, and was released May 23, 2010. The CD reached #24 on the Classical Billboard Charts] in its first week, and has since received great critical acclaim: “Beethoven chamber music enthusiasts will rejoice in this issue. The chance to hear splendid examples of unfamiliar Beethoven, in his most frolicsome classical vein, played with great flair by three of Chicago’s finest young musicians makes this a welcome and self-recommending release.” (Chicago Tribune’s CD of the week, July 8, 2010)

== Radio and television ==
The Beethoven Project Trio has been featured several times on Chicago's 98.7WFMT Radio, as well as on American Public Media's Performance Today. The group was also featured on CBS Evening News February 28, 2009. Their recording has also been the featured CD of the Week at numerous radio stations across the United States, including Chicago's WFMT, New York's WQXR, and Washington DC's WETA.

== Film ==
The Beethoven Project Trio is the subject of a documentary currently in production and directed by the Emmy Award winning film maker, Mike Cahill. A short version of the film can be seen online.

== The International Beethoven Project ==
The International Beethoven Project is a not-for-profit organization based out of Chicago. It was established in 2009 by founder, president and artistic director George Lepauw. The IBP serves as an umbrella organization for the Beethoven Project Trio, the Prometheus Ensemble, the Beethoven Festival, the Beethoven Festival Orchestra, and the Beethoven Spirit Award.

The International Beethoven Project is most well known for its productions of festivals, concerts, films, educational outreach, lectures and art exhibits both in the United States and internationally.

== Prometheus Ensemble ==
The Prometheus Ensemble is a group formed to supplement the Beethoven Project Trio. The group’s size changes according to the repertoire. Regular performers have included David Taylor (Assistant Concertmaster of the Chicago Symphony Orchestra), Li-Kuo Chang (Assistant Principal Viola of the Chicago Symphony Orchestra), Patrick Jee (Acting Principal Cello of the Lyric Opera), Paula Kosower, Larry Combs (former Principal Clarinet of the Chicago Symphony Orchestra), Aurelien Pederzoli (Vice-President of IBP), Kenneth Olsen (Assistant Principal Cello of the Chicago Symphony Orchestra), Sang Mee Lee, Wendy Warner and George Lepauw.

== The IBP Beethoven Festival ==
The Beethoven Festival is a multidisciplinary event in celebration of Beethoven’s music and influences, which includes musical performances, lectures, dance performances, film and contemporary art expositions, as well as master classes and other educational outreach. While the festival is centered around the music and idea of Beethoven, it does not limit itself to his works only, but rather uses Beethoven as an inspiration for making music and art relevant in the 21st century.

"Beethoven Festival 2011: Man and Muse" - the inaugural IBP festival - took place over five days at the Chicago Urban Arts Society September 14–18, 2011. Some of the festival's performers included pianists George Lepauw, Winston Choi and Marta Aznavoorian; members of the Chicago Symphony Orchestra and the Avalon and Spektral quartets; Fulcrum Point New Music Project; Ensemble Dal Niente; Anaphora Ensemble; and Quintet Attacca. John Von Rhein of the Chicago Tribune called the festival “an ambitious, eclectic, barrier-blasting, uneven, ultimately wonderful cornucopia of Beethoveniana” and Mia Clarke of Time Out Chicago called it “the unexpected smash of the season!" and "Chicago’s hippest and most inclusive classical festival to date."

"Beethoven Festival: Revolution 2012, which ran September 8–16, 2012, more than doubled its size in just one year. Spanning over nine days, the Festival found its second-year home at Chicago’s National Pastime Theater National Pastime Theater, where it presented more than sixty events. Performers for the 2012 festival included cellists Amit Peled and Stéphane Tétreault, pianists James Rhodes, Charles Rosen, Soheil Nasseri, and HJ Lim; violinists Rachel Kolly d'Alba, James Ehnes, and Rachel Barton Pine, composers Mikolaj Gorecki and Mohammed Fairouz; conductors Daniel Boico, Matthias Pintscher, Josephine Lee; ensembles including the Chicago Children’s Choir, the Fine Arts Quartet, the Spektral Quartet, Ensemble Dal Niente, Callipygian Players, Anaphora Ensemble, Prometheus Ensemble and Nu Directions among others. Along with performances of many Beethoven masterworks, including the Chicago Premiere of Beethoven’s ballet “The Creatures of Prometheus” and the Second and Third Symphonies with the Beethoven Festival Orchestra, Beethoven Festival 2012 presented a dozen rock, pop, folk, and blues groups for the non-classical portions of the Festival, including a performance by jazz musician Ernest Dawkins and blues legend Jimmy Burns. Classical performances also included music from the Medieval and Baroque periods, the Classical and Romantic periods, and a solid representation of 20th-century composers. Additionally, the festival presented nearly twenty-five world premieres by some of the most celebrated composers working today, including David Winkler, Mohammed Fairouz, Mikolaj Gorecki, Ken Ueno and others.

== Beethoven Festival Orchestra ==
The Beethoven Festival Orchestra was founded in 2011. Its conductors to date have included Daniel Boico, Robert McConnell, Josephine Lee and Matthias Pintscher.

== Beethoven Spirit Award ==
Since 2009, the International Beethoven Project has given the Beethoven Spirit Award to special individuals for visionary work to the benefit of humankind in the spirit of Beethoven's ideals of human brotherhood. To date, the winners have been Herve and Isabelle de la Vauvre (2009), Otto von Habsburg (2011) and Zarin Mehta (2012).
