= Linda Hirshman =

American lawyer and author (1944–2023)

- Born: Linda Diane Redlick; April 26, 1944; Cleveland, Ohio, U.S.
- Died: October 31, 2023 (aged 79); Burlington, Vermont, U.S.
- Education: Cornell University (BA); University of Chicago (JD); University of Illinois Chicago (PhD)
- Occupations: Lawyer; academic; author
- Spouses: Harold Hirshman (m. 1966; div. 1984); David Forkosh (died 2012)
- Children: 1
- Writing career
- Subjects: American history; law; feminism

Linda Diane Redlick Hirshman (April 26, 1944 – October 31, 2023) was an American lawyer, pundit, academic, and author. She began her career practicing as union-side labor lawyer and argued before the Supreme Court of the United States. She next taught law and philosophy at Chicago-Kent College of Law and Brandeis University, then wrote books focused on law, women, and social movements, including the New York Times best-seller Sisters in Law, which describes Supreme Court justices Sandra Day O'Connor and Ruth Bader Ginsburg. Hirshman was also known for her 2005 article "Homeward Bound", in which she prominently and controversially criticized the absence of women from the workplace, urging women in high-status jobs to continue pursuing careers rather than become homemakers.

== Early life and education ==
Linda Diane Redlick was born in Cleveland on April 26, 1944. She earned a bachelor's degree in political science from Cornell University, a J.D. from the University of Chicago Law School in 1969, and a Ph.D. in philosophy from the University of Illinois Chicago in 1995. She wrote her dissertation on Thomas Hobbes.

== Career ==
For 15 years, Hirshman practiced law, mostly representing organized labor. She participated in three cases in the Supreme Court of the United States, including, in 1985, the landmark case of Garcia v. San Antonio Metropolitan Transit Authority, which upheld the power of the federal government to apply the Fair Labor Standards Act to employees of state and local government. She then went into academia, teaching law, philosophy, and women's studies. She taught at Chicago-Kent College of Law and then at Brandeis University beginning in 1996, retiring from teaching in 2002 as a distinguished professor of philosophy and women's studies.

Hirshman wrote for a variety of periodicals, including The New York Times, The Washington Post, Slate, Salon, and The Daily Beast.

=== "Homeward Bound" and Get to Work ===
In 2005, Hirshman published the article "Homeward Bound" in The American Prospect, in which she expressed concern that highly educated women were leaving professional life after marriage in order to become homemakers. Instead, she encouraged women in high-profile or "elite" fields, like business and law, to continue working and increase female representation in positions of influence. She argued that abandoning such a career to be a full-time housewife was a socially harmful choice, as it decreased that representation, and the women leaving the workforce were squandering their qualifications and talents on the "repetitious, socially invisible, physical tasks" of domestic life.

The New York Times said the article "succeeded in offending just about everybody", from social conservatives to advocates of what Hirshman termed choice feminism. According to her own biographical byline for periodicals, she "landed spot No. 77" on conservative author Bernard Goldberg's list of 100 People Who Are Screwing Up America. She was also criticized by feminist bloggers such as Leslie Morgan Steiner and economists such as Heather Boushey for having insufficient empirical evidence for her contention that women were dropping out of the U.S. labor market, a charge which Hirshman said did not change her conclusions.

The following year, she released the book Get to Work: A Manifesto for Women of the World in which she developed her arguments and further addressed some of the criticism of her earlier work.

=== Later work ===
In June 2012, Hirshman released her new book, a social movement study, Victory: The Triumphant Gay Revolution. Starting in the late nineteenth century and ending when New York State legalized same-sex marriage, Victory tells the story of this political success. In 2015, she published Sisters in Law, an account of the careers of the first two women to serve as justices of the Supreme Court, Sandra Day O'Connor and Ruth Bader Ginsburg, and how they have advanced the cause of women's rights. It became a New York Times Best Seller. In 2019, a play based on that book, also called Sisters in Law, premiered at the Wallis Annenberg Center for the Performing Arts in Beverly Hills, California. Also in 2019, her book Reckoning: The Epic Battle Against Sexual Abuse and Harassment was published.

The last book she completed was The Color of Abolition (2022), about the contentious relationship between Frederick Douglass and white abolitionists. At the time of her death she was working on a book with Margaret Sullivan about right-wing media and its impact on democracies.

== Personal life and death ==
In 1966, she married Harold Hirshman, whom she met in college; they had a daughter and divorced in 1984. She then married David Forkosh, and became a stepmother to his two children. He died in 2012.

Hirshman died from cancer in Burlington, Vermont, on October 31, 2023, at the age of 79.
