= Martin D. Ginsburg =

American legal scholar (1932–2010)

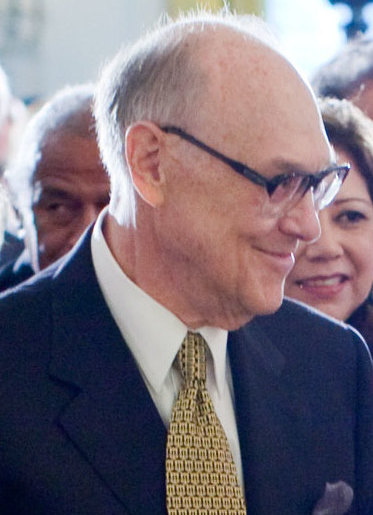
- Martin Ginsburg at a White House event, 2009
- Born: Martin David Ginsburg; June 10, 1932; New York City, U.S.
- Died: June 27, 2010 (aged 78); Washington, D.C., U.S.
- Burial place: Arlington National Cemetery
- Spouse: Ruth Bader (m. 1954)
- Children: Jane; James

Academic background
- Education: Cornell University (BA); Harvard University (LLB)

Academic work
- Discipline: Taxation law
- Institutions: Columbia University; Georgetown University
- Influenced: David Schizer

Martin David Ginsburg (June 10, 1932 – June 27, 2010) was an American lawyer who specialized in tax law and was the husband of American lawyer and U.S. Supreme Court Justice Ruth Bader Ginsburg. He taught law at Georgetown University Law Center in Washington, D.C., and was of counsel in the Washington, D.C., office of the American law firm Fried, Frank, Harris, Shriver & Jacobson.

== Early life and education ==
Ginsburg was born in Brooklyn, New York City, on June 10, 1932, to Evelyn (née Bayer) and Morris Ginsburg, a department store executive. He grew up in Rockville Centre on Long Island, where he attended South Side High School. His family was Jewish.

Ginsburg earned a A.B. in chemistry from Cornell University in 1953 and a J.D., magna cum laude, from Harvard Law School in 1958. He was a star on Cornell's golf team. After finishing a year at law school, Ginsburg married Joan Ruth Bader in 1954, after her graduation from Cornell. The same year, Ginsburg, a ROTC graduate commissioned in the Army Reserve, was called up for active duty and stationed at Fort Sill, Oklahoma, for two years.

In 1956, he returned to law school, transferring to Harvard Law School along with his wife's admission there. During his third year at Harvard, Ginsburg endured two operations and radiation therapy to treat testicular cancer.

== Career ==
After graduating from law school in 1958, Ginsburg joined the firm Weil, Gotshal & Manges. He was subsequently admitted to the bar in New York in 1959 and in the District of Columbia in 1980.

Ginsburg taught at New York University Law School as an adjunct faculty member from 1967 to 1979. He was a visiting professor at Stanford Law School (1977–1978), Harvard Law School (1985–1986), the University of Chicago Law School (1989–1990), and New York University School of Law (1992–1993). He was a tenured professor at Columbia Law School (Charles Keller Beekman Professor of Law) from 1979 to 1980, and at Georgetown Law Center from 1980 until his death in 2010.

In 1971, Ginsburg's firm represented Ross Perot in a business matter, and the two men became close friends. After President Jimmy Carter nominated his wife to the U.S. Court of Appeals for the District of Columbia Circuit in 1980, Ginsburg reached out to Perot and other influential friends to assure her Senate confirmation. In 1984, Ginsburg resolved complex tax questions that threatened General Motors's acquisition of Perot's Electronic Data Systems. In 1986, Perot endowed the Martin Ginsburg chair in taxation at Georgetown, although Ginsburg himself never held this seat.

== Personal life and marriage ==
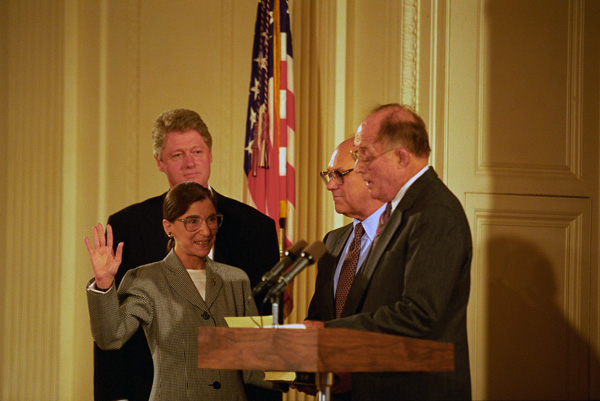
Ginsburg and President Bill Clinton look on as Ruth Bader Ginsburg is sworn in as an Associate Justice of the Supreme Court by Chief Justice William Rehnquist (August 10, 1993)

Shortly after graduating from Cornell in 1954, Ginsburg married Ruth Bader on June 23. Ruth said she and Martin decided whatever profession they pursued, they would pursue it together. The couple chose law, and both studied at Harvard Law School.

Ruth was famously a terrible cook, and Martin soon discovered that if he wanted to enjoy good food with his family, he would have to learn how to cook himself. Starting with the Escoffier Cookbook, Martin became an accomplished French chef in his own right. Ruth found herself expelled from the kitchen by her children who preferred the meals Marty would prepare to hers.

Cooking also proved to be a shared common interest with Maureen Scalia, and established Martin as a welcome addition with the Supreme Court spouses. Martha-Ann Alito would compile many of the recipes Marty had shared over the years and publish Chef Supreme as a gift for Ruth on Martin's passing in 2010. Ruth loved the cookbook and asked that it be offered for sale through the court's gift shop.

Martin and Ruth are the parents of Jane Carol Ginsburg (born 1955), and James Steven Ginsburg (born 1965). Martin often told people how he did not make Law Review at Harvard, and Ruth did, sharing how he was proud of her successes, even when they were above his own. However, as he was very successful in his career as a tax attorney, the couple enjoyed supporting one another and maintaining balance. Ginsburg was quoted as saying, "We had nearly two whole years far from school, far from career pressures and far from relatives, to learn about each other and begin to build a life." They thrived in their own domains. As his lighthearted self, Martin liked to say he was very lucky to have gotten in on an incredible journey by marrying Ruth, on her pathway to the Supreme Court.

== Death ==
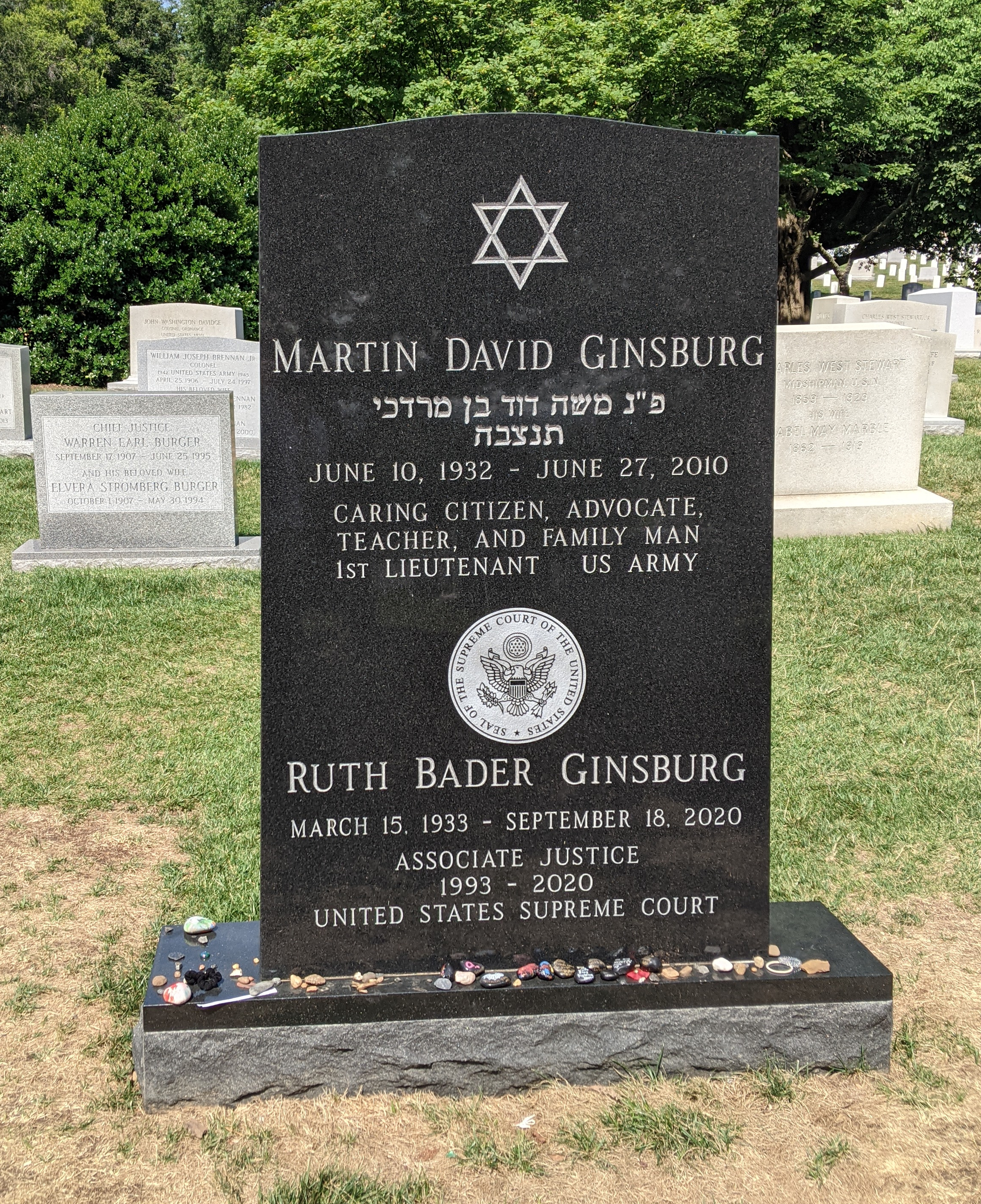
Martin D. Ginsburg grave marker

Martin David Ginsburg died from testicular cancer on June 27, 2010, at the age of 78. As a US Army Reserve ROTC officer, he was buried at Arlington National Cemetery. Following her death from pancreatic cancer in 2020, Ruth Ginsburg was laid to rest in Arlington next to her husband.

== In popular culture ==
Martin was an accomplished amateur chef and Martha-Ann Alito published Chef Supreme, a cookbook of many of the recipes he had shared over the years in 2011. It is offered for sale through the Supreme Court's gift shop.

In the 2018 film On the Basis of Sex, a biography of Ruth Bader Ginsburg, Marty is portrayed by Armie Hammer, with Ruth played by Felicity Jones.

== Writings ==
- Martin D. Ginsburg, Spousal Transfers: In '58, It Was Different, Harvard Law Record, May 6, 1977, at 11
- Ginsburg, Martin (1995). Mergers, acquisitions, and buyouts. A transactional analysis of the governing tax, legal, and accounting considerations (Jan. 1995 ed.). Boston, Massachusetts: Little, Brown. ISBN 0-316-31275-4.
- Ginsburg, Martin (1995). Mergers, acquisitions, and buyouts. Sample acquisition agreements with tax and legal analysis (Jan. 1995 ed.). Boston, Massachusetts: Little, Brown.
- Ginsburg, Martin (1994). Mergers, acquisitions, and leveraged buyouts. A transactional analysis of the governing tax, legal, and accounting considerations as of ... Chicago, Illinois: Commerce Clearing House.
- Martin D. Ginsburg, ed. (1970). SEC and tax consequences of corporate acquisitions. Carl W. Schneider. New York, New York: Practising Law Institute.
- Martin D. Ginsburg, ed. (1989). Mergers, acquisitions, and leveraged buyouts. Jack S. Levin. Chicago, Illinois: Commerce Clearing House.
- coauth, "Maintaining Subchapter S in an Integrated Tax World," Tax Law Rev 47 (93)
- coauth, "The Subchapter S One Class of Stock Regulation, Tax Notes 69 (95): 233
- auth, "The S Corporation Reform Act: Generally a Good Start, Tax Notes 67 (95): 1825
- auth, "The Taxpayer Relief Act of 1997: Worse Than You Think, Tax Notes 76 (97): 1790
- coauth, "Evaluating Proposals to Tax Intragroup Spin-Offs, Tax Notes (97)
- auth, "Taxing the Components of Income: A U.S. Perspective, Georgetown Law J, 23 (97)
- auth, "Some Thoughts on Working, Saving, and Consuming in Nunn–Domenici's Tax World," Nat Tax J 48 (97): 585
- repub, Tax Policy in the Real World, Cambridge Univ Press, 99
- auth, "Presentation: U.S. Tax Court's Memorial Service for Senior Judge Theodore Tannenwald, Jr.," TC (99)
- "In Memoriam: Theodore Tannenwald, Jr.," Tax Lawyer (99)
- Levin, Jack S. (May 22, 2009). Ginsburg, Martin D.; Rocap, Donald E.; Light, Russell S. (eds.). Structuring Venture Capital, Private Equity, and Entrepreneurial Transactions (PDF) (2009 ed.). Aspen Publishers. ISBN 978-0-7355-8160-9. LCCN 97647593. Archived from the original (PDF) on 2011-07-13.
