= Cedille Records =

Chicago-based classical music record label

- Parent company: Chicago Classical Recording Foundation
- Founded: 1989; 37 years ago
- Founder: James Ginsburg
- Distributor: Naxos Records (US)
- Genre: Classical
- Country of origin: U.S.
- Location: Chicago, Illinois
- Official website: cedillerecords.org

Cedille Records (/ˈseɪdiː/) is the independent record label of the Chicago Classical Recording Foundation.

== History ==
In 1989, James Ginsburg, the son of U.S. Supreme Court Associate Justice Ruth Bader Ginsburg, founded Cedille Records as a for-profit classical music recording company featuring Chicago-area musicians. Ginsburg's vision for Cedille was "to record local musicians overlooked by the major labels." Cedille is the only Chicago-based classical label since Mercury Living Presence in the 1950s. In 1994, Cedille was transformed into a not-for-profit record label under the umbrella of the Chicago Classical Recording Foundation.

The label's releases included The Pulitzer Project, an album featuring Chicago's Grant Park Symphony Orchestra which includes two world premier recordings: William Schuman's "A Free Song" (Pulitzer 1943) and Leo Sowerby's "Canticle of the Sun" (Pulitzer 1946).

== Awards and honors ==
Several CDs released on the label have won or been nominated for Grammy Awards. In 2004 Brahms & Joachim Violin Concertos was nominated for the Grammy Award for Best Engineered Album, Classical and in 2005 Robert Kurka Symphonic Works was nominated in the same category. In 2008 the ensemble eighth blackbird won the Grammy Award for Best Chamber Music Performance for their album strange imaginary animals. In the same year, Judith Sherman won the Grammy Award for Producer of the Year, Classical for her work with the label. strange imaginary animals was included among her production credits along with Jennifer Koh's album String Poetic, which was nominated in the Best Chamber Music Performance category in the same year. In 2009, Ursula Oppens' album Oppens Plays Carter was nominated for Best Instrumental Soloist Performance (without orchestra) in 2009. Most of those nominated for Grammy Awards and an additional thirty-one albums released on the label have received Classics Today's highest rating, 10/10.

The song "Nulla in Mundo Pax Sincera" from A Vivaldi Concert was featured in the documentary Pale Male, an episode of the documentary series Nature on PBS.

== Roster ==
- Dmitry Paperno
- Easley Blackwood, Jr.
- David Schrader
- Kim Scholes
- Rembrandt Chamber Players
- Patrice Michaels
- Georgia Mangos and Louise Mangos
- Chicago Symphony Orchestra
- Boston Symphony Orchestra
- Vermeer Quartet
- John Bruce Yeh
- Chicago Chamber Musicians
- Chicago Baroque Ensembles
- Paul Freeman
- Rachel Barton Pine
- Czech National Symphony Orchestra
- Joyce Castle
- Chicago Opera Theater
- Encore Chamber Orchestra
- His Majestie's Clerkes
- Patrick Sinozich
- Alex Klein
- Mary Stolper
- Wendy Warner
- Chicago Pro Musica
- Pacifica Quartet
- Nancy Gustafson
- Cathy Basrak
- Chicago Sinfonietta
- Prague Chamber Chorus
- Gaudete Brass Quintet
- Michael Tree
- Jennifer Koh
- Grant Park Orchestra
- New Budapest Orpheum Society
- eighth blackbird
- Amelia Trio
- Recho Uchida
- Jorge Federico Osorio
- Mathieu Dufour
- Charles Pickler
- Gary Stucka
- Scottish Chamber Orchestra
- Orion Ensemble
- Elizabeth Buccheri
- Cavatina Duo
- Matthew Hagle
- Trio Settecento
- Biava Quartet
- Lincoln Trio
- William Ferris Chorale
- Composer Festival Orchestra
- Richard Young
- Ricardo Castro
- Jennifer Larmore
- Royal Philharmonic Orchestra
- Chicago a cappella
- Ursula Oppens
- Chicago Children's Choir
- Baroque Band
- Beethoven Project Trio
- Jerome Lowenthal
- Irina Nuzova
- Kuang Hao-Huang
- New Brandenburg Collegium

== See also ==
- List of record labels
