= Omnibus Judgeship Act of 1978 =

U.S. law expanding the federal judiciary

- Long title: An Act to provide for the appointment of additional district and circuit judges, and for other purposes.
- Enacted by: the 95th United States Congress
- Effective: October 20, 1978

Citations
- Public law: 95-486

Legislative history
- Introduced in the House as H.R. 7843 by Peter Rodino Jr. (D–NJ) on June 16, 1977; Committee consideration by Judiciary; Passed the House on February 7, 1978 (319–80); Passed the Senate on February 7, 1978 with amendment; House agreed to Senate amendment on October 4, 1978 (292–112) with further amendment; Senate agreed to House amendment on October 7, 1978 (67–15); Signed into law by President Jimmy Carter on October 20, 1978

The Omnibus Judgeship Act of 1978 (Pub. L. 95–486, 92 Stat. 1629, enacted October 20, 1978) is a major law in the United States that expanded the Federal Judiciary by adding 117 district judges and 35 circuit judges.
