= Sisters in Law (book) =

2015 non-fiction book

- Author: Linda Hirshman
- Audio read by: Andrea Gallo
- Language: English
- Subject: Legal Feminism
- Genre: Non-fiction
- Publisher: Harper
- Publication date: September 1, 2015
- Publication place: United States

Sisters in Law: How Sandra Day O'Connor and Ruth Bader Ginsburg Went to the Supreme Court and Changed the World is a 2015 non-fiction book by Linda Hirshman. The book examines the legal careers and judicial records of Sandra Day O'Connor and Ruth Bader Ginsburg, the first and second women appointed to the Supreme Court of the United States.

== Synopsis ==
The book follows the careers and backgrounds of the first two women to serve on the Supreme Court of the United States — Sandra Day O'Connor and Ruth Bader Ginsburg — and attempts to situate their respective biographies, ascent to the court, and judicial records within the broader context of the women's rights movement. Both women met with sexist challenges to their continued careers upon graduating from law school in the 1950s, but O'Connor acceded to the conservative values of putting her family first, and rose to power within Arizona's Republican Party mostly as a volunteer and socialite, until taking the reins as appointed majority leader in the Arizona State Senate. Ginsburg, with the support of her successful tax-attorney husband, chose the parallel routes of academia and activism, founding and heading the American Civil Liberties Union's Women's Rights Project. In this project, she sought to promote cases that would eradicate any formal inequalities between men and women, focusing to a great degree on challenging laws providing benefits to women, which she saw as promoting stereotypes of women as weak and incapable of independent action.

According to Hirshman's analysis, the two women used both their judicial skills and court politics to promote women's rights, though in different ways, as O'Connor remained a staunch Republican and Ginsburg was a classic liberal. Hirshman surveys major cases to prove her thesis that both women justices contributed to massive changes in women's rights, especially lauding Ginsburg, whom she compares with Wolfgang Amadeus Mozart and Jane Austen: “Mozart had, by many accounts, five operatic masterpieces. Jane Austen’s reputation rests on five novels. . . . In five landmark cases over less than a decade, [Ginsburg] largely transformed the constitutional status of women in America.”

Hirshman also focuses on the relationship between the two justices, using as an example the Virginia Military Institute case, United States v. Virginia, which struck down the long-standing male-only admission policy of the school, and is widely considered "the jewel in the crown" of Ginsburg's majority opinions. As the senior justice, O'Connor could have written the opinion, but in an act of generosity, demurred, saying, "This should be Ruth's."

== Background ==
Author Linda Hirshman is a lawyer, philosopher and cultural historian, whose focus is on social movements such as the struggle against sexual and gender violence, gay rights and women's rights. As a lawyer, she focused mostly on labor law, appearing before the Supreme Court in three cases (one win, one loss and one draw), including Garcia v. San Antonio Metropolitan Transit Authority, a landmark case in which the Court held that the Congress has the power under the Commerce Clause of the Constitution to extend the Fair Labor Standards Act of 1938, which requires that employers provide minimum wage and overtime pay to their employees, to state and local governments.

Hirshman has also been a professor of philosophy and women's studies at Brandeis University, professor of law at Chicago-Kent College of Law, and visiting professor at Northwestern Law School. Hirshman received a PhD in Philosophy from University of Illinois Chicago, a Juris Doctor from University of Chicago Law School and a Bachelor of Arts from Cornell University.

== Reception ==
Sisters in Law became a bestseller, appearing on The New York Times and The Washington Post bestseller lists.

=== Critical reception ===
According to The New York Times critic Linda Greenhouse, "There is a fascinating book struggling to emerge from the narrative structure Linda Hirshman has imposed on rich material." She notes that Hirshman is an obvious admirer of Ginsburg, but is less sure how to present conservative O'Connor as a champion of women's rights, which is the thesis of the book, ultimately settling for describing her strategy as one of defense, in which "she would not permit the courts to roll the equality ball backward," while Ginsburg, for her part, "played offense," advocating for change.

Kirkus Reviews called Sisters in Law "[a]n intelligent, evenhanded look at a changing society and its legal foundations." Publishers Weekly gave the book a positive review, citing in particular "the unusual step of addressing the influence that Supreme Court law clerks can have on the Court’s decision-making," and the "quality time" Hirshman spends "discussing the evolution of the constitutional theories that the justices apply when analyzing such flash-point issues as reproductive rights and workplace sexual harassment." The review also lauds "Hirshman’s conversational style and deep analysis of several precedent-setting constitutional cases [that] should appeal to both casual and professional readers.

== In popular culture ==
In 2019 a play premiered based on the book, also called Sisters in Law. The book was adapted for the stage by playwright Jonathan Shapiro, and Patricia McGregor directed. Tovah Feldshuh portrayed Ginsburg, and Stephanie Faracy portrayed O'Connor. The Hollywood Reporter deemed that the timing of the production was perfect, given that "the conundrum of the #MeToo era is that even while women are being empowered with agency, they're still making only 79 cents on the dollar compared to men, reproductive rights are being quietly scaled back and a Supreme Court justice with sexual assault charges leveled against him was seated without a thorough investigation." The review found the production to be visually strong, and intelligently rendered, as the two characters relitigate major cases that marked their respective careers. However, the review also found that "Sisters in Law's greatest deficiency is that it's all head and no heart."

According to the Los Angeles Times, the dialog of the play is engaging, marked by "beautifully paced and illuminating banter", and positively noted the performances, costume design and set design. Notwithstanding the general praise of the review, reviewer Margaret Gray nevertheless finds that the play oversimplifies two complex characters, and disapproves of some of the techniques used to make the spectator expect that what occurs on stage is close to what happened in reality, an expectation not delivered in the production.

== Publication history ==
United States:

- Hardcover edition: Harper, September 1, 2015; 416 pp; ISBN 978-0062238467
- Paperback edition: Harper, September 6, 2016; 432 pp; ISBN 978-0062238474
- Audiobook: Harper, September 1, 2015; Narrator: Andrea Gallo; 13:28; ASIN B00YAZBWS0
- eBook - Kindle: Harper, September 1, 2015; ASIN B00RLR9RPE
