= List of Joe Biden 2020 presidential campaign congressional endorsements =

This is a list of members of the United States Congress who have endorsed Joe Biden's campaign for President of the United States in the 2020 U.S. presidential election.

== Senate ==
=== Current ===
All 47 incumbent Democratic Senators endorsed Biden.

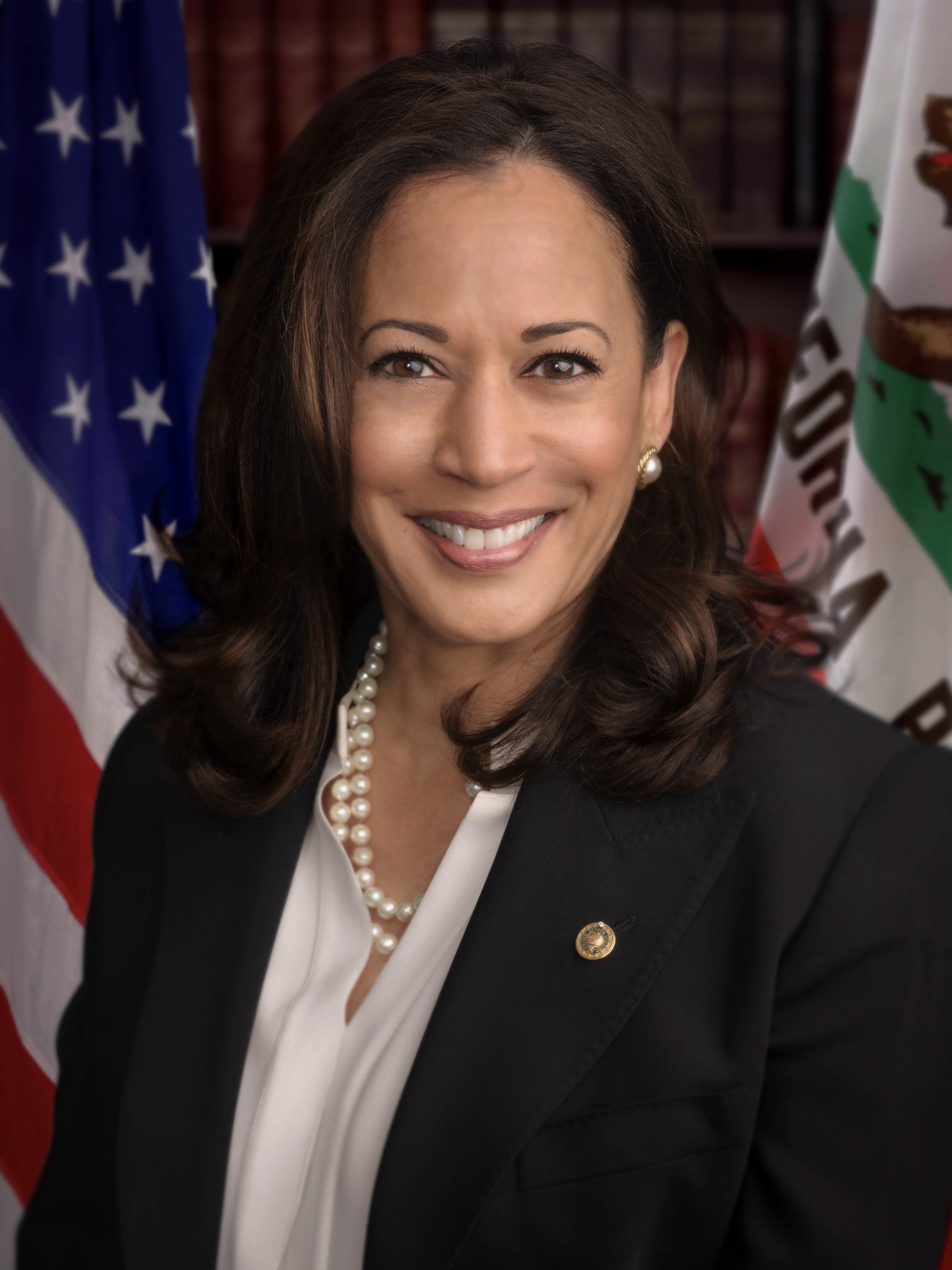
Kamala Harris

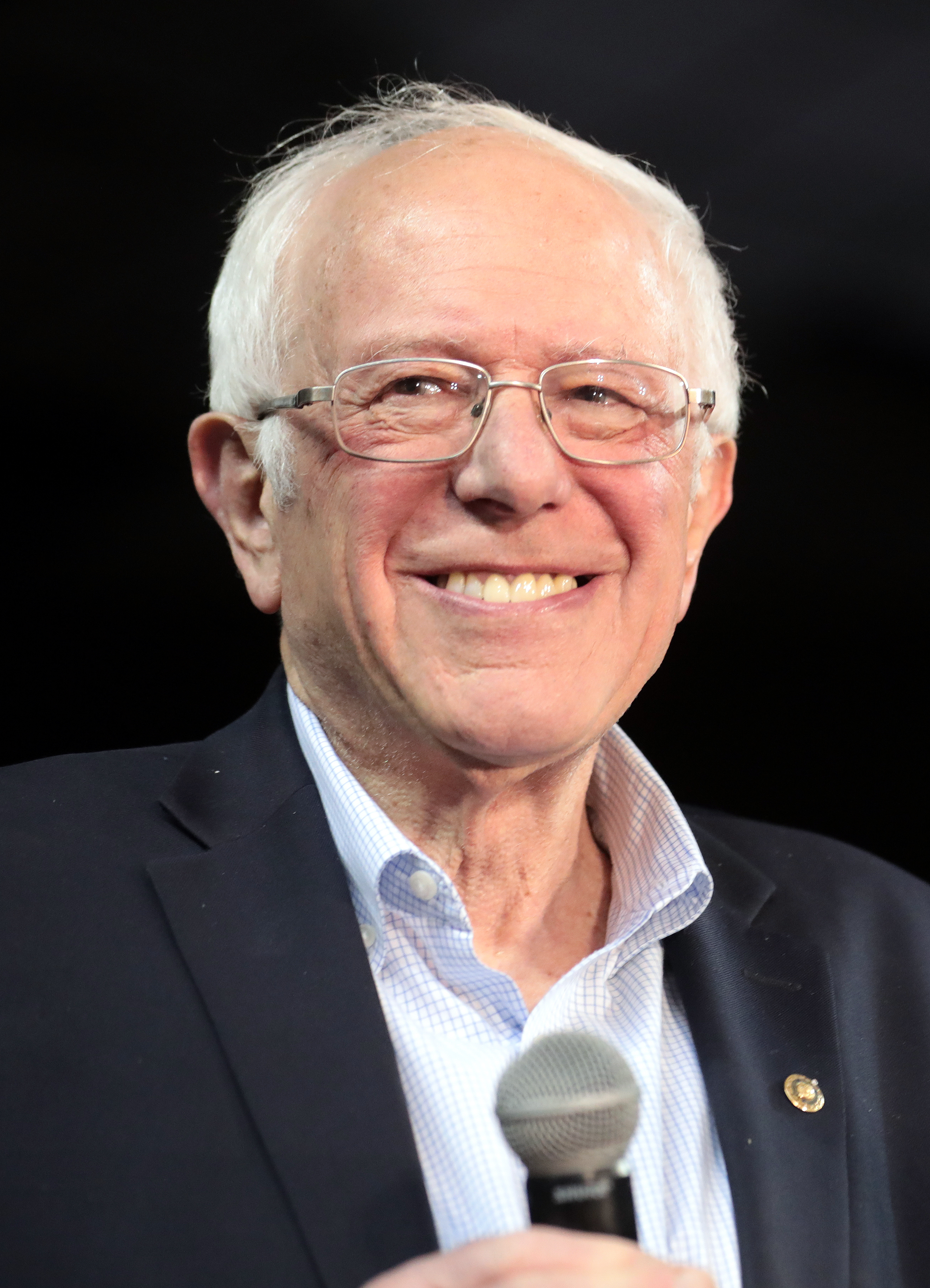
Bernie Sanders

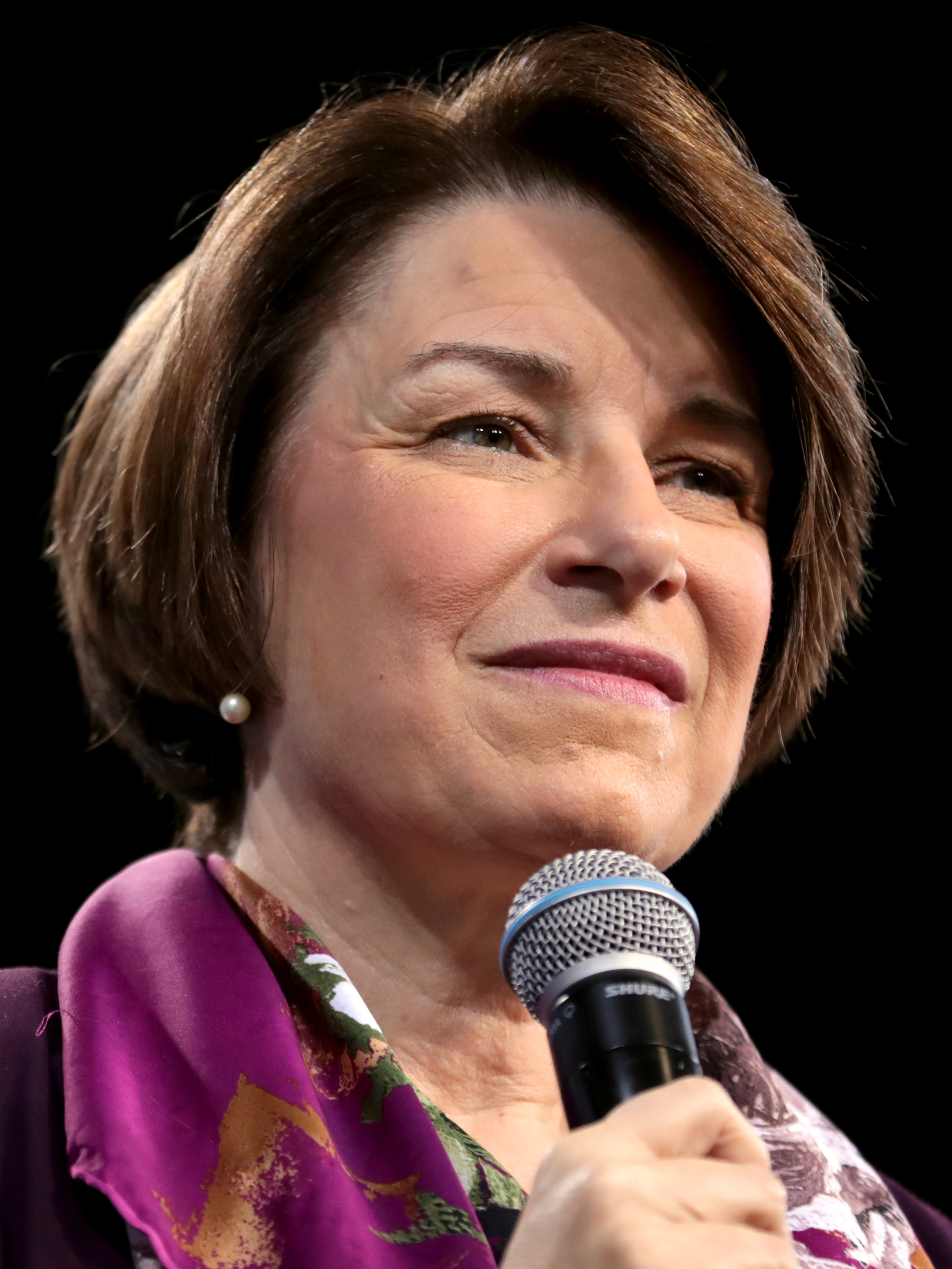
Amy Klobuchar

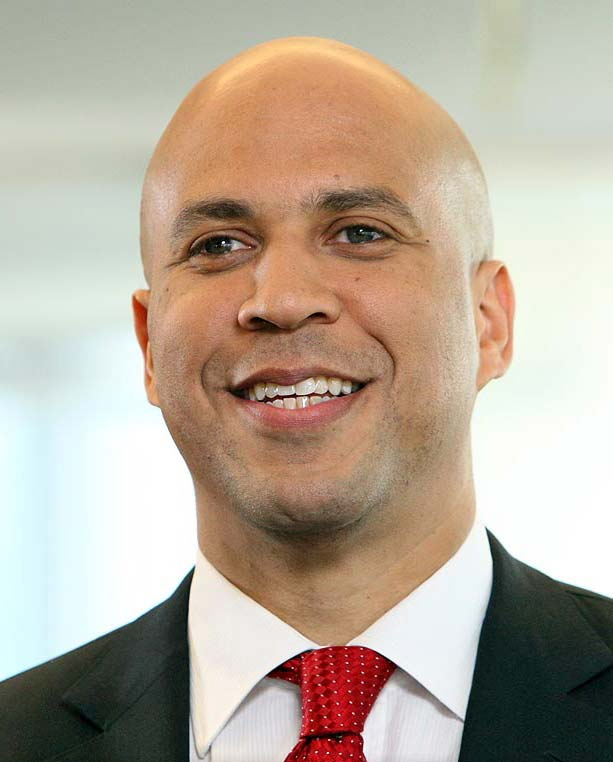
Cory Booker

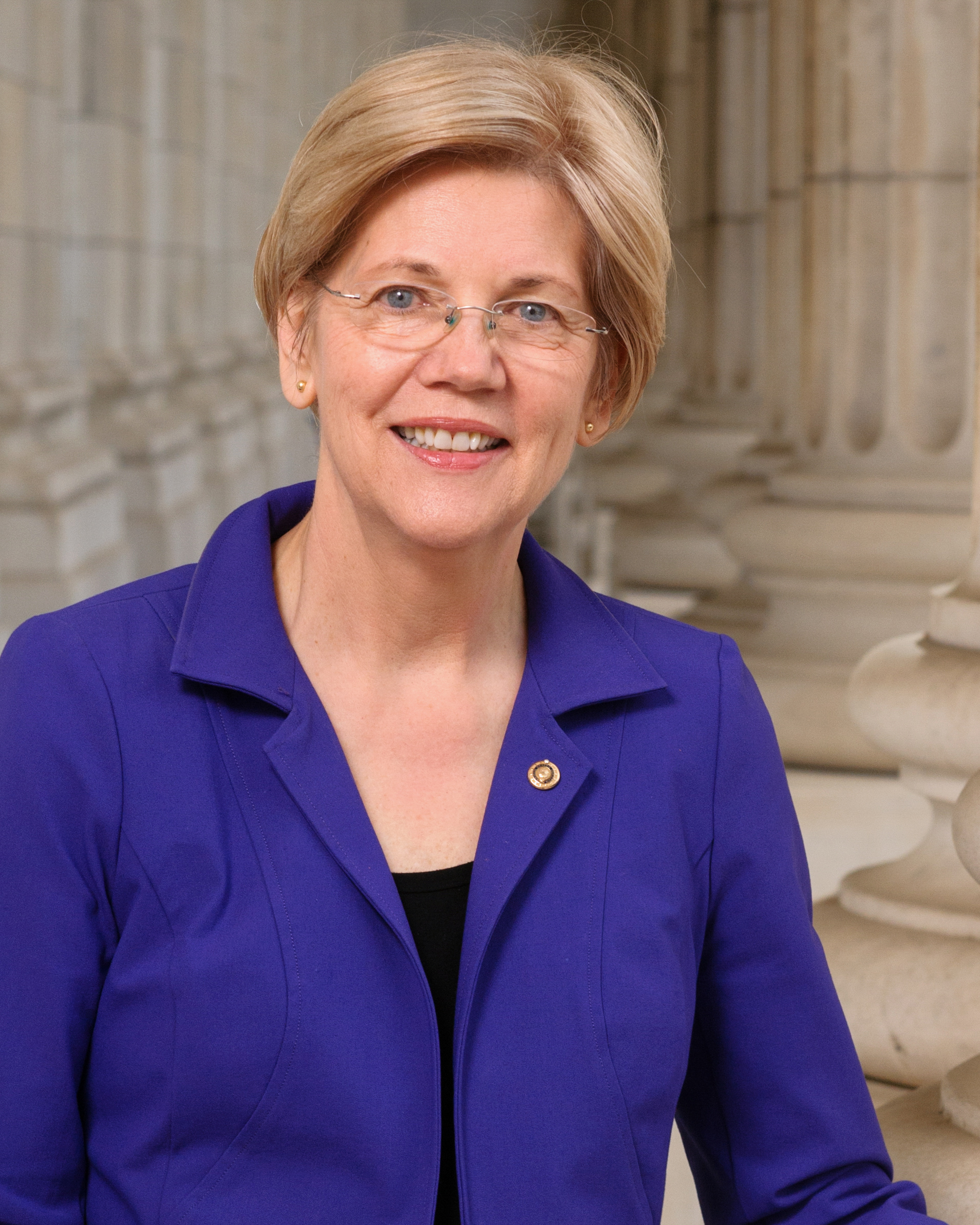
Elizabeth Warren

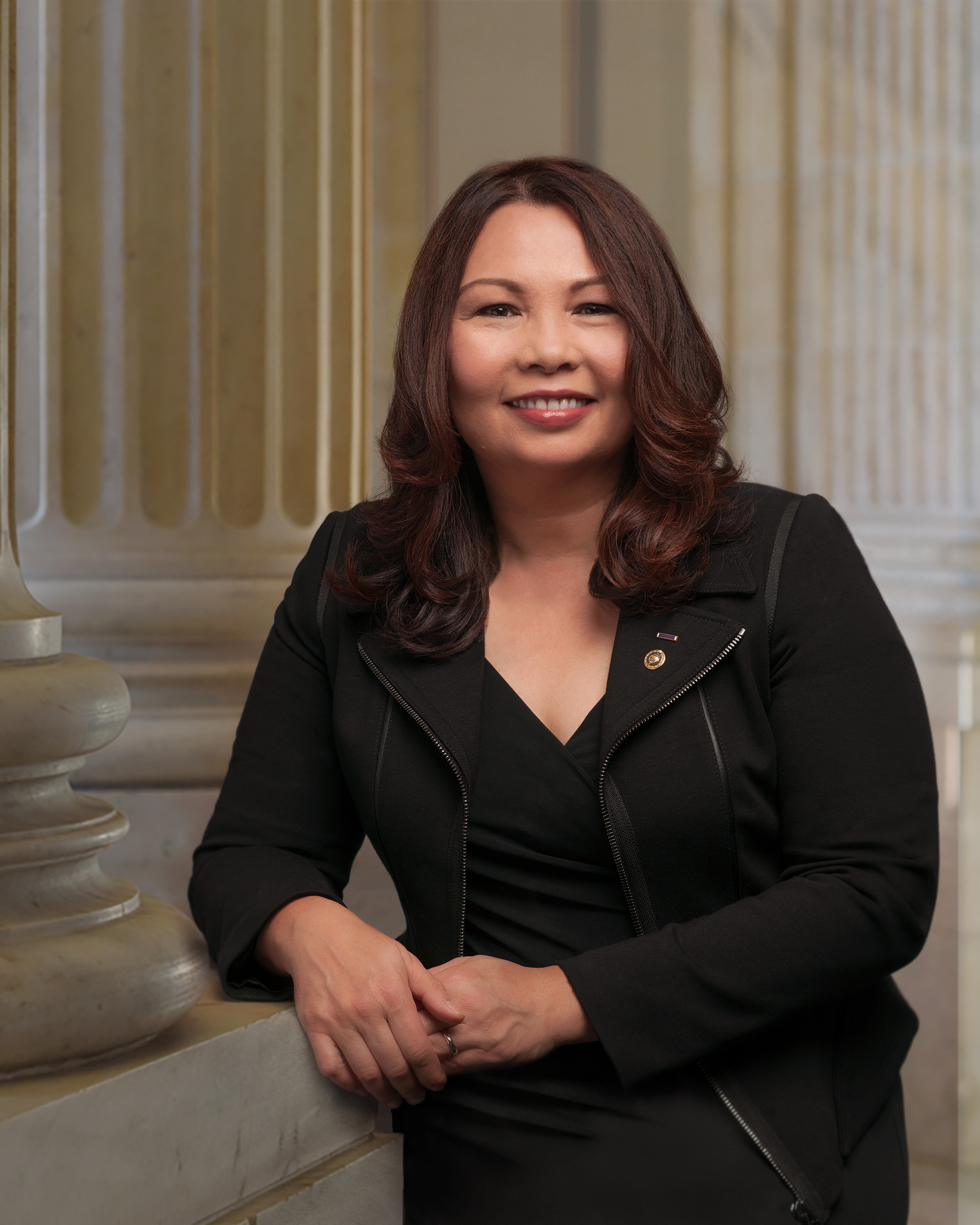
Tammy Duckworth

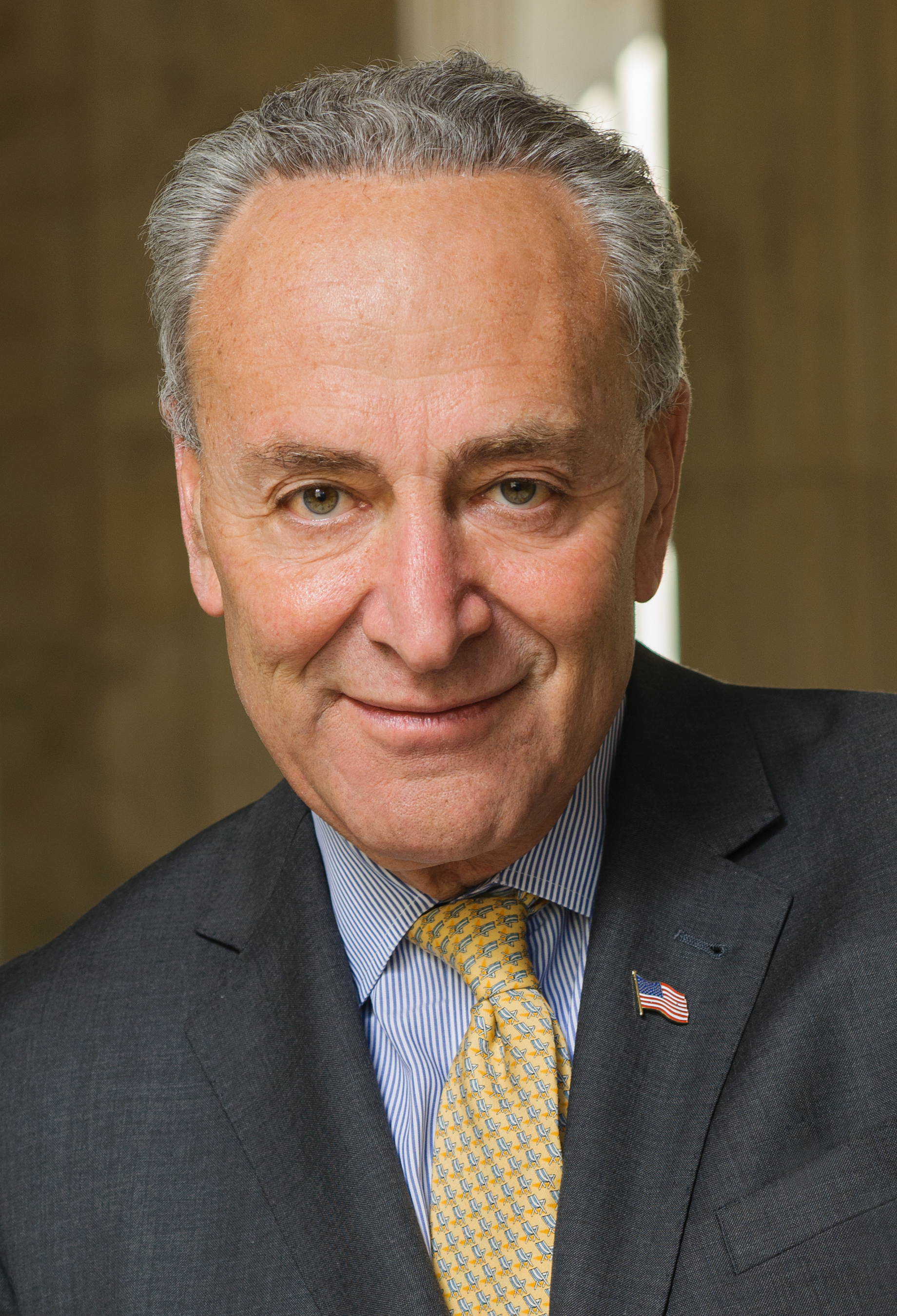
Chuck Schumer

- Tammy Baldwin, U.S. Senator from Wisconsin (2013–present), U.S. Representative from WI-02 (1999–2013)
- Carlos Romero Barceló, Shadow Senator from Puerto Rico (2017–2021), Resident Commissioner of Puerto Rico (1993–2001), Governor of Puerto Rico (1977–1985)
- Michael Bennet, U.S. Senator from Colorado (2009–present), 2020 candidate for president
- Richard Blumenthal, U.S. Senator from Connecticut (2011–present), Attorney General of Connecticut (1991–2011), Connecticut State Senator from the 27th District (1987–1991), Connecticut State Representative of the 145th District (1985–1987), U.S. Attorney for the District of Connecticut (1977–1981)
- Cory Booker, U.S. Senator from New Jersey (2013–present), Mayor of Newark, NJ (2006–2013), 2020 candidate for president
- Sherrod Brown, U.S. Senator from Ohio (2007–2025), U.S. Representative from OH-13 (1993–2007), Secretary of State of Ohio (1983–1991)
- Maria Cantwell, U.S. Senator from Washington (2001–present), former U.S. Representative from WA-01 (1993–1995)
- Ben Cardin, U.S. Senator from Maryland (2007–2025), U.S. Representative from MD-03 (1987–2007)
- Tom Carper, U.S. Senator from Delaware (2001–2025), Chair of the National Governors Association (1998–1999), Governor of Delaware (1993–2001), U.S. Representative from DE-AL (1983–1993), Treasurer of Delaware (1977–1983)
- Bob Casey Jr., U.S. Senator from Pennsylvania (2007–2025), Auditor General of Pennsylvania (1997–2005)
- Chris Coons, U.S. Senator from Delaware (2010–present), County Executive of New Castle County (2005–2010)
- Tammy Duckworth, U.S. Senator from Illinois (2017–present), U.S. Representative from IL-08 (2013–2017), Assistant Secretary of Veterans Affairs for Public and Intergovernmental Affairs (2009–2011), Director of the Illinois Department of Veterans Affairs (2006–2009)
- Dick Durbin, U.S. Senator from Illinois (1997–present), Senate Democratic Whip (2007–present), U.S. Representative from IL-20 (1983–1997)
- Dianne Feinstein, U.S. Senator from California (1992–2023), Mayor of San Francisco, CA (1978–1988)
- Kirsten Gillibrand, U.S. Senator from New York (2009–present), U.S. Representative from NY-20 (2007–2009), 2020 candidate for president
- Kamala Harris, U.S. Senator from California (2017–2021), 2020 nominee for Vice President, Attorney General of California, (2011–2017), District Attorney of San Francisco (2004–2011), 2020 candidate for president
- Maggie Hassan, U.S. Senator from New Hampshire (2017–present), Governor of New Hampshire (2013–2017), Majority Leader of the New Hampshire Senate (2008–2010), New Hampshire State Senator from District 23 (2004–2010)
- Martin Heinrich, U.S. Senator from New Mexico (2013–present), U.S. Representative from NM-01 (2009–2013), Member of the Albuquerque City Council (2004–2008)
- Mazie Hirono, U.S. Senator from Hawaii (2013–present), U.S. Representative from HI-02 (2007–2013), Lieutenant Governor of Hawaii (1994–2002)
- Doug Jones, U.S. Senator from Alabama (2018–2021), U.S. Attorney for the Northern District of Alabama (1997–2001)
- Tim Kaine, U.S. Senator from Virginia (2013–present), 2016 nominee for vice president, Chair of the Democratic National Committee (2009–2011), Governor of Virginia (2006–2010), Lieutenant Governor of Virginia (2002–2006), Mayor of Richmond, VA (1998–2001)
- Angus King, U.S. Senator from Maine (2013–present), Governor of Maine (1995–2003) (Independent, caucuses with Democrats)
- Amy Klobuchar, U.S. Senator from Minnesota (2007–present), 2020 candidate for president
- Patrick Leahy, U.S. Senator from Vermont (1975–2023), President pro tempore of the United States Senate (2012–2015, 2021–2023)
- Joe Manchin, U.S. Senator from West Virginia (2010–2025), Chair of the National Governors Association (2010), Governor of West Virginia (2005–2010), Secretary of State of West Virginia (2001–2005)
- Ed Markey, U.S. Senator from Massachusetts (2013–present), U.S. Representative from Massachusetts (1976–2013)
- Catherine Cortez Masto, U.S. Senator from Nevada (2017–present), Attorney General of Nevada (2007–2015)
- Bob Menendez, U.S. Senator from New Jersey (2006–2024), U.S. Representative from NJ-13 (1993–2006)
- Jeff Merkley, U.S. Senator from Oregon (2009–present), speaker of the Oregon House of Representatives (2007–2009)
- Chris Murphy, U.S. Senator from Connecticut (2013–present), U.S. Representative from CT-05 (2007–2013)
- Patty Murray, U.S. Senator from Washington (1993–present)
- Gary Peters, U.S. Senator from Michigan (2015–present), U.S. Representative from MI-14 (2013–2015) and MI-09 (2009–2013)
- Jack Reed, U.S. Senator from Rhode Island (1997–present), U.S. Representative from RI-02 (1991–1997)
- Jacky Rosen, U.S. Senator from Nevada (2019–present), U.S. Representative from NV-03 (2017–2019)
- Bernie Sanders, U.S. Senator from Vermont (2007–present), U.S. Representative from VT-AL, Mayor of Burlington, VT (1981–1989), 2020 and 2016 candidate for president (Independent, caucuses with Democrats)
- Brian Schatz, U.S. Senator from Hawaii (2012–present), Lieutenant Governor of Hawaii (2010–2012), Chair of the Democratic Party of Hawaii (2008–2010)
- Chuck Schumer, U.S. Senator from New York (1999–present), Senate Democratic Leader (2017–present)
- Jeanne Shaheen, U.S. Senator from New Hampshire (2009–present), Governor of New Hampshire (1997–2003)
- Kyrsten Sinema, U.S. Senator from Arizona (2019–2025), U.S. Representative from AZ-09 (2013–2019)
- Tina Smith, U.S. Senator from Minnesota (2018–present), Lieutenant Governor of Minnesota (2015–2018)
- Debbie Stabenow, U.S. Senator from Michigan (2001–2025), U.S. Representative from MI-08 (1997–2001)
- Jon Tester, U.S. Senator from Montana (2007–2025), President of the Montana Senate (2005–2007)
- Tom Udall, U.S. Senator from New Mexico (2009–2021), U.S. Representative from NM-03 (1999–2009), Attorney General of New Mexico (1991–1999)
- Chris Van Hollen, U.S. Senator from Maryland (2017–present), House Democratic Assistant to the Leader (2009–2011), U.S. Representative from MD-08 (2003–2017)
- Mark Warner, U.S. Senator from Virginia (2009–present), Chair of the National Governors Association (2004–2005), Governor of Virginia (2002–2006), Chair of the Virginia Democratic Party (1993–1995)
- Elizabeth Warren, U.S. Senator from Massachusetts (2013–present), 2020 candidate for President
- Sheldon Whitehouse, U.S. Senator from Rhode Island (2007–present), Attorney General of Rhode Island (1999–2003), U.S. Attorney for the District of Rhode Island (1993–1998)
- Ron Wyden, U.S. Senator from Oregon (1996–present), U.S. Representative from OR-03 (1981–1996)

=== Former ===
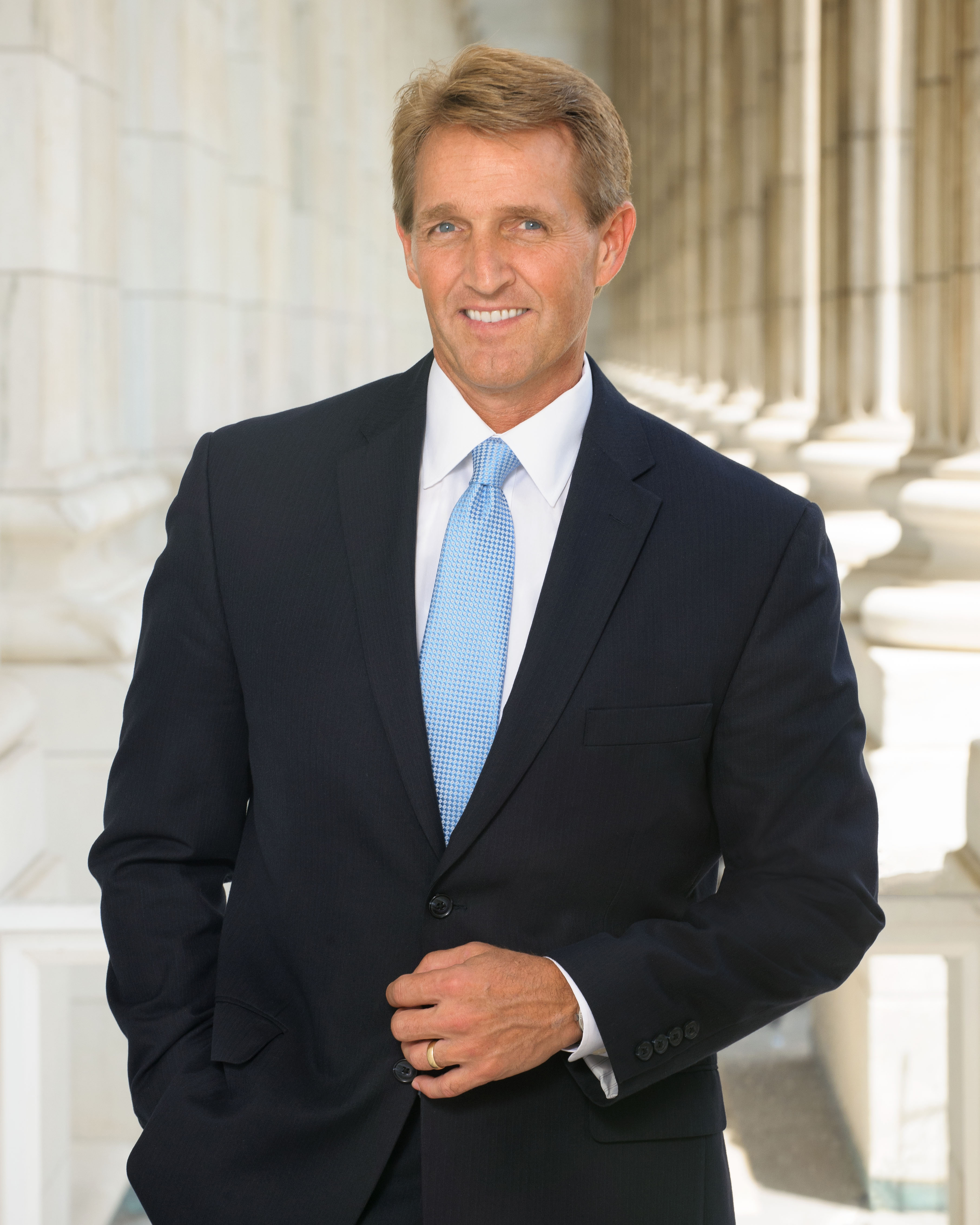
Jeff Flake

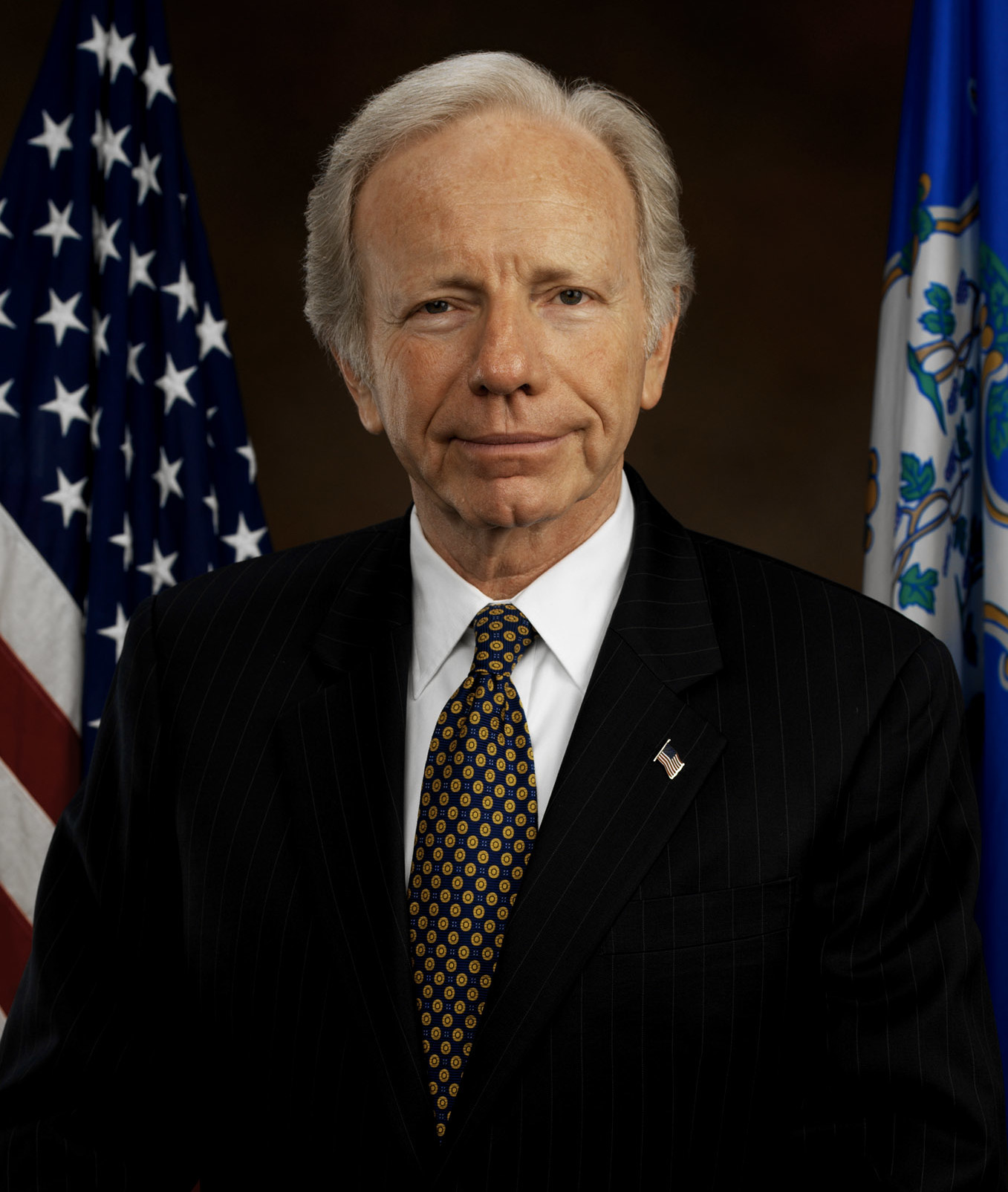
Joe Lieberman

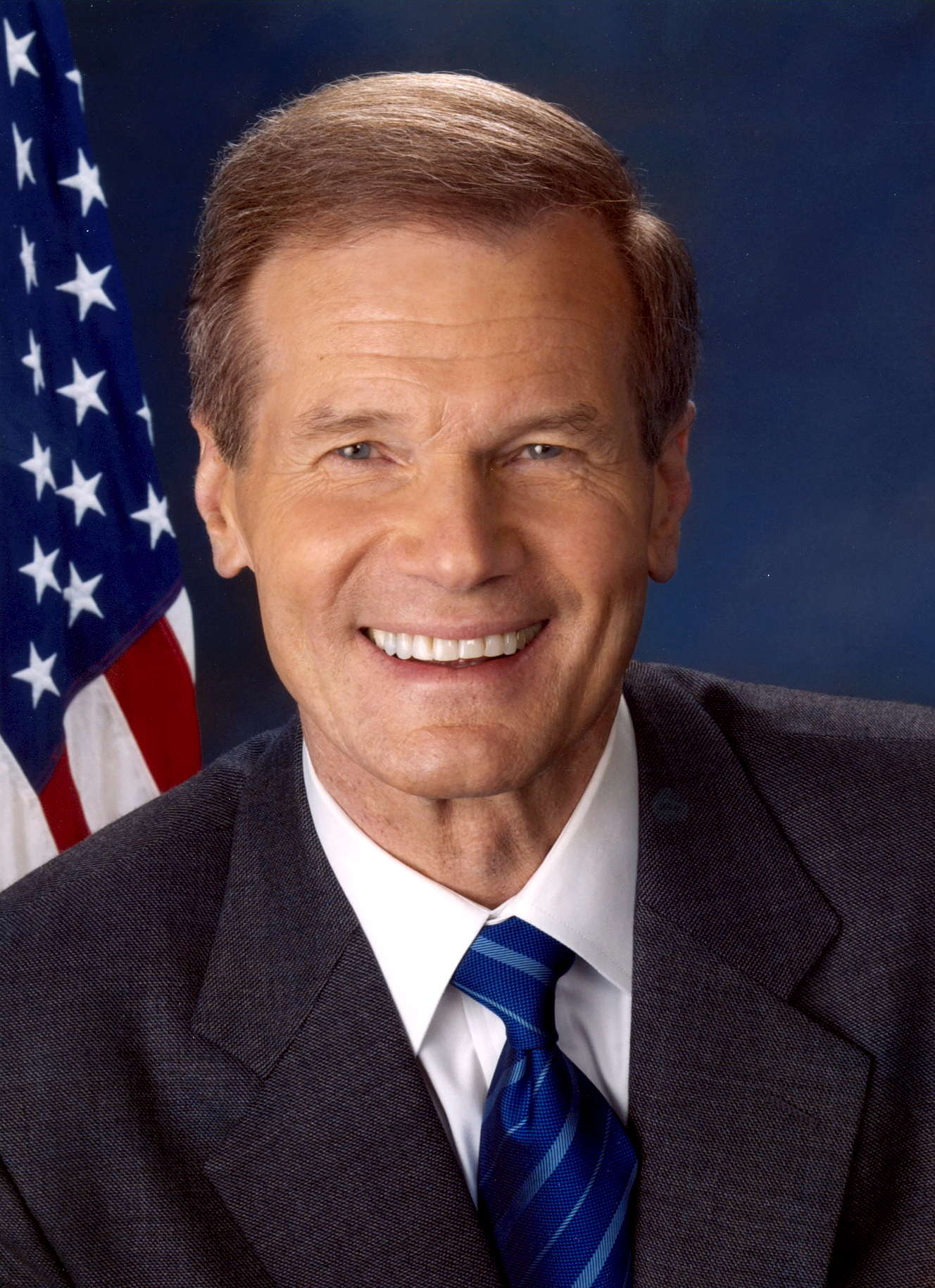
Bill Nelson

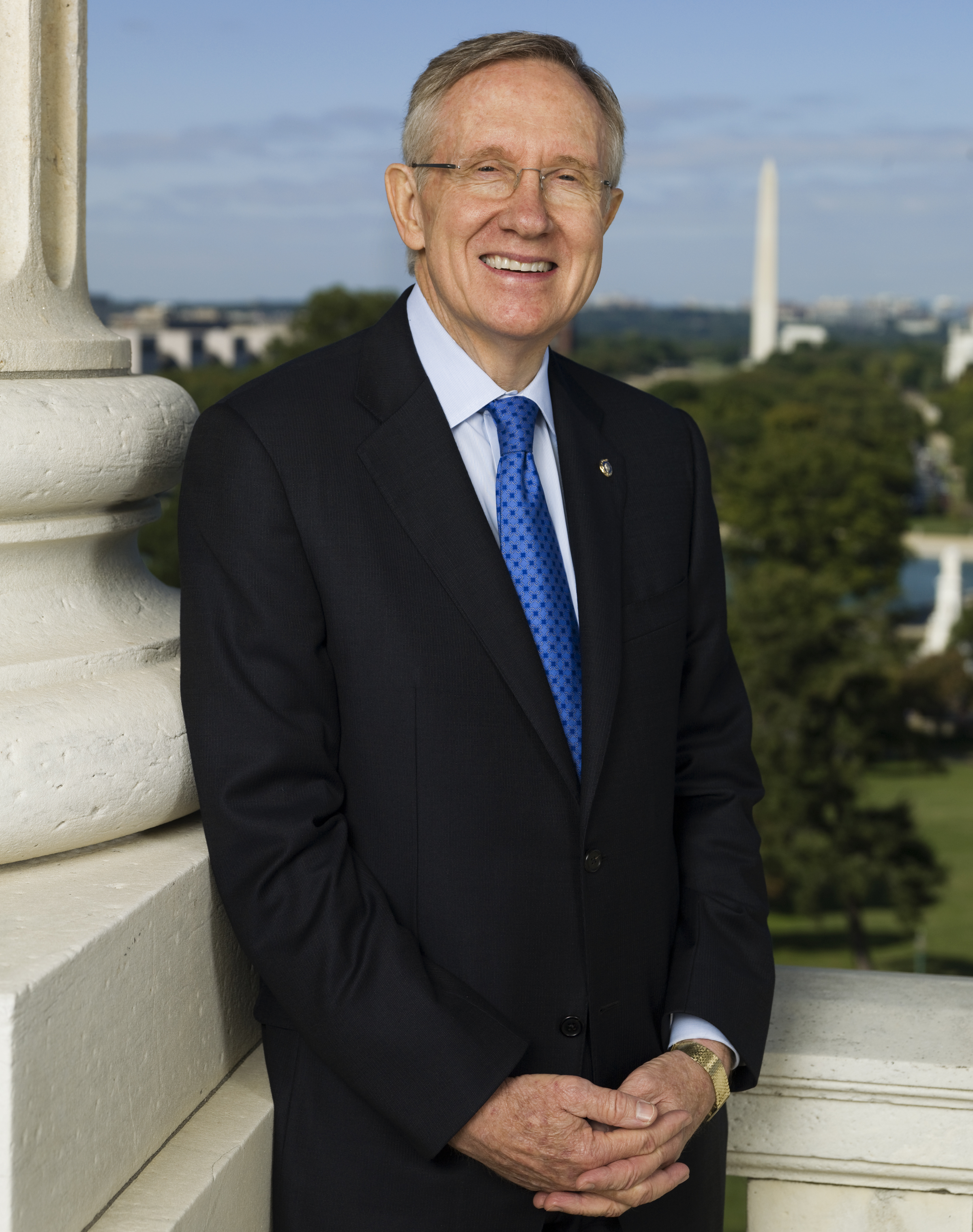
Harry Reid

- Max Baucus, U.S. Senator from Montana (1978–2014), U. S. Ambassador to China (2014–2017), Chair (2001–2003, 2007–2014) and Ranking Member (2003–2007) of the Senate Finance Committee, Chair of the Senate Environment Committee (1993–1995), United States House of Representatives from MT-01 (1975–1978); Member of the Montana House of Representatives from the 18th District (1973–1975)
- Evan Bayh, U.S. Senator from Indiana (1999–2011), Governor of Indiana (1989–1997)
- Mark Begich, U.S. Senator from Alaska (2009–2015), Mayor of Anchorage, AK (2003–2009)
- Jeff Bingaman, U.S. Senator from New Mexico (1983–2013), Attorney General of New Mexico (1979–1983)
- Barbara Boxer, U.S. Senator from California (1993–2017), U.S. Representative from CA-06 (1983–1993)
- Bill Bradley, U.S. Senator from New Jersey (1979–1997), 2000 candidate for President
- Richard Bryan, U.S. Senator from Nevada (1989–2001), Governor of Nevada (1983–1989), Attorney General of Nevada (1983–1989)
- Roland Burris, U.S. Senator from Illinois (2009–2010), Attorney General of Illinois (1991–1995)
- Jean Carnahan, U.S. Senator from Missouri (2001–2002), First Lady of Missouri (1993–2000)
- Max Cleland, U.S. Senator from Georgia (1997–2003), Secretary of State of Georgia (1983–1996), Administrator of Veterans Affairs (1977–1981)
- Kent Conrad, U.S. Senator from North Dakota (1992–2013), Tax Commissioner of North Dakota (1981–1986)
- Jon Corzine, U.S. Senator from New Jersey (2001–2006), Governor of New Jersey (2006–2010)
- Tom Daschle, U.S. Senator from South Dakota (1987–2005), Senate Democratic Leader (1995–2005), U.S. Representative from SD-AL (1983–1987) and SD-01 (1979–1983)
- Mark Dayton, Governor of Minnesota (2011–2019), U.S. Senator from Minnesota (2001–2007), Minnesota State Auditor (1991–1995)
- Dennis DeConcini, U.S. Senator from Arizona (1977–1995)
- Chris Dodd, U.S. Senator from Connecticut (1981–2011), General Chair of the Democratic National Committee (1995–1997), U.S. Representative from CT-02 (1975–1981)
- Joe Donnelly, U.S. Senator from Indiana (2013–2019), U.S. Representative from IN-02 (2007–2013)
- Byron Dorgan, U.S. Senator from North Dakota (1992–2011), U.S. Representative from ND-AL (1981–1992), Tax Commissioner of North Dakota (1969–1981)
- David Durenberger, U.S. Senator from Minnesota (1978–1995) (Formerly Republican, Independent since 2005)
- Jeff Flake, U.S. Senator from Arizona (2013–2019), U.S. Representative from AZ-06 (2003–2013) and AZ-01 (2001–2003) (Republican)
- Al Franken, U.S. Senator from Minnesota (2009–2018)
- Bob Graham, U.S. Senator from Florida (1987–2005), Governor of Florida (1979–1987)
- Heidi Heitkamp, U.S. Senator from North Dakota (2013–2019), Attorney General of North Dakota (1992–2000), Tax Commissioner of North Dakota (1986–1992)
- Gordon J. Humphrey, U.S. Senator from New Hampshire (1979–1990) (Independent)
- Tim Johnson, U.S. Senator from South Dakota (1997–2015), U.S. Representative from SD-AL (1987–1997)
- Ted Kaufman, U.S. Senator from Delaware (2009–2010)
- Bob Kerrey, U.S. Senator from Nebraska (1989–2001), Governor of Nebraska (1983–1987)
- Paul G. Kirk, U.S. Senator from Massachusetts (2009–2010), Chair of the Democratic National Committee (1985–1989)
- Herb Kohl, U.S. Senator from Wisconsin (1989–2013)
- Mary Landrieu, U.S. Senator from Louisiana (1997–2015), Treasurer of Louisiana, (1988–1996), Member of the Louisiana House of Representatives from the 90th district
- Carl Levin, U.S. Senator from Michigan (1979–2015)
- Joe Lieberman, U.S. Senator from Connecticut (1989–2013), 2000 nominee for vice president, Attorney General of Connecticut (1983–1989) (Democrat before 2006, Independent since 2006)
- Blanche Lincoln, U.S. Senator from Arkansas (1999–2011), U.S. Representative from AR-01 (1993–1997)
- Carol Moseley Braun, U.S. Senator from Illinois (1993–1999), U.S. Ambassador to New Zealand and Samoa (1999–2001); Cook County, Illinois Recorder of the Deeds (1988–1992); Member of the Illinois House of Representatives from the 25th district (1983–1988) and the 24th district (1979–1983)
- Claire McCaskill, U.S. Senator from Missouri (2007–2019), State Auditor of Missouri (1999–2007), Prosecutor of Jackson County, Missouri (1993–1998)
- Barbara Mikulski, U.S. Senator from Maryland (1987–2017), U.S. Representative from MD-03 (1977–1987)
- George J. Mitchell, U.S. Senator from Maine (1980–1995), United States Special Envoy for Northern Ireland (1995–2001)
- Ben Nelson, U.S. Senator from Nebraska (2001–2013), Governor of Nebraska (1991–1999)
- Bill Nelson, U.S. Senator from Florida (2001–2019), Treasurer of Florida (1995–2001), U.S. Representative from FL-11 (1983–1991)
- Sam Nunn, U.S. Senator from Georgia (1972–1997)
- Larry Pressler, U.S. Senator from South Dakota (1979–1997), U.S. Representative from SD-01 (1975–1979) (Republican before 2013, Independent since 2013)
- David Pryor, Chair of the Arkansas Democratic Party (2008–2009), U.S. Senator from Arkansas (1979–1997), Governor of Arkansas (1975–1979), U.S. Representative from AR-04 (1966–1973)
- Mark Pryor, U.S. Senator from Arkansas (2003–2015), Attorney General of Arkansas (1999–2003)
- Harry Reid, U.S. Senator from Nevada (1987–2017), Senate Democratic Leader (2007–2017), Senate Democratic Whip (2001–2005), U.S. Representative from NV-01 (1983–1987), Lieutenant Governor of Nevada (1971–1975)
- Jay Rockefeller, U.S. Senator from West Virginia (1985–2015), Governor of West Virginia (1977–1985), Secretary of State of West Virginia (1969–1973)
- Paul Sarbanes, U.S. Senator from Maryland (1977–2007), U.S. Representative from MD-03 (1973–1977), U.S. Representative from MD-04 (1971–1973)
- Jim Sasser, U.S. Senator from Tennessee (1977–1995), U.S. Ambassador to China (1996–1999)
- Robert Torricelli, U.S. Senator from New Jersey (1997–2003), U.S. Representative from NJ-09 (1983–1997)
- Mark Udall, U.S. Senator from Colorado (2009–2015), U.S. Representative from CO-02 (1999–2009)
- John Warner, U.S. Senator from Virginia (1979–2009), Secretary of the Navy (1972–1974) (Republican)

== House of Representatives ==
=== Current ===
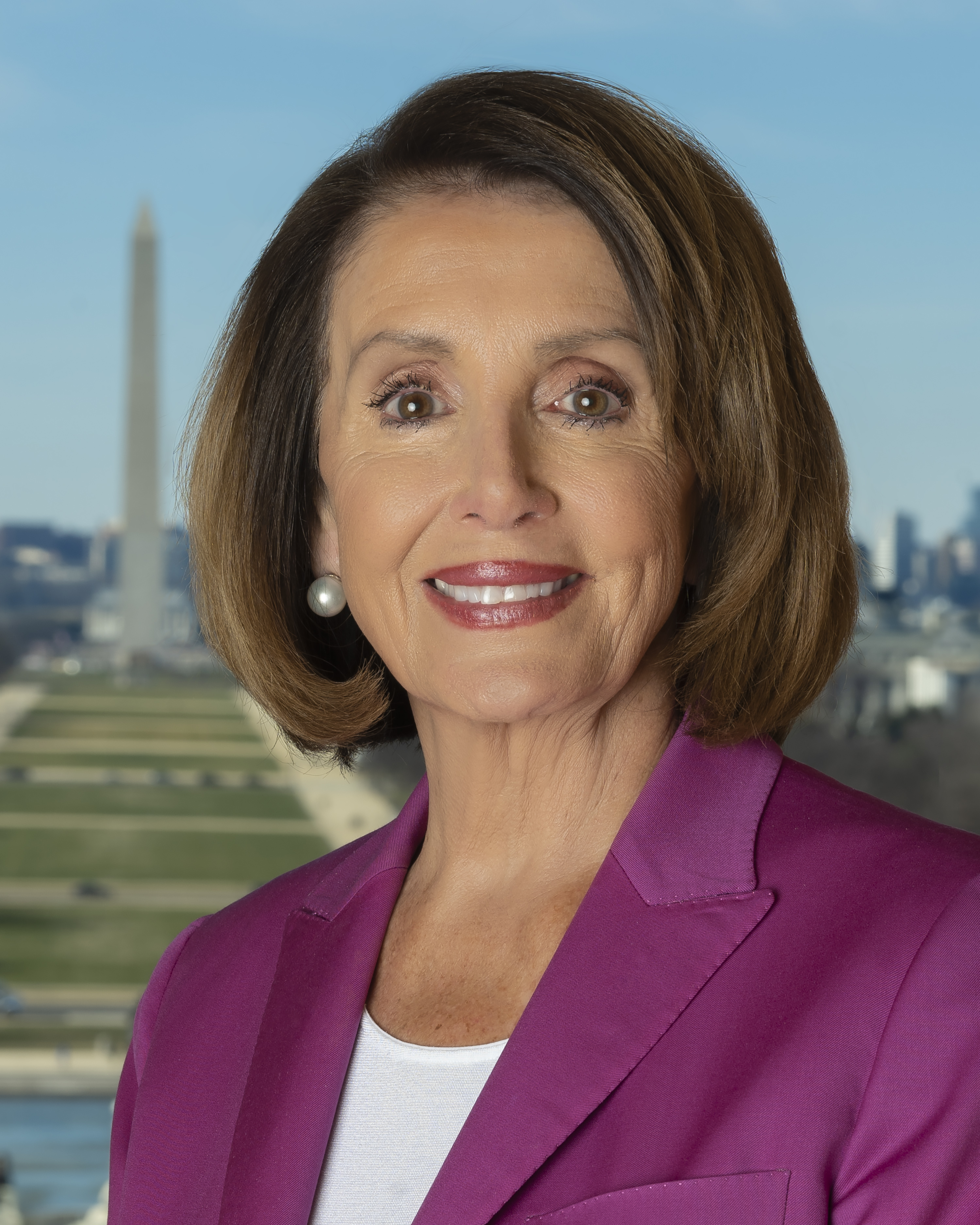
Nancy Pelosi

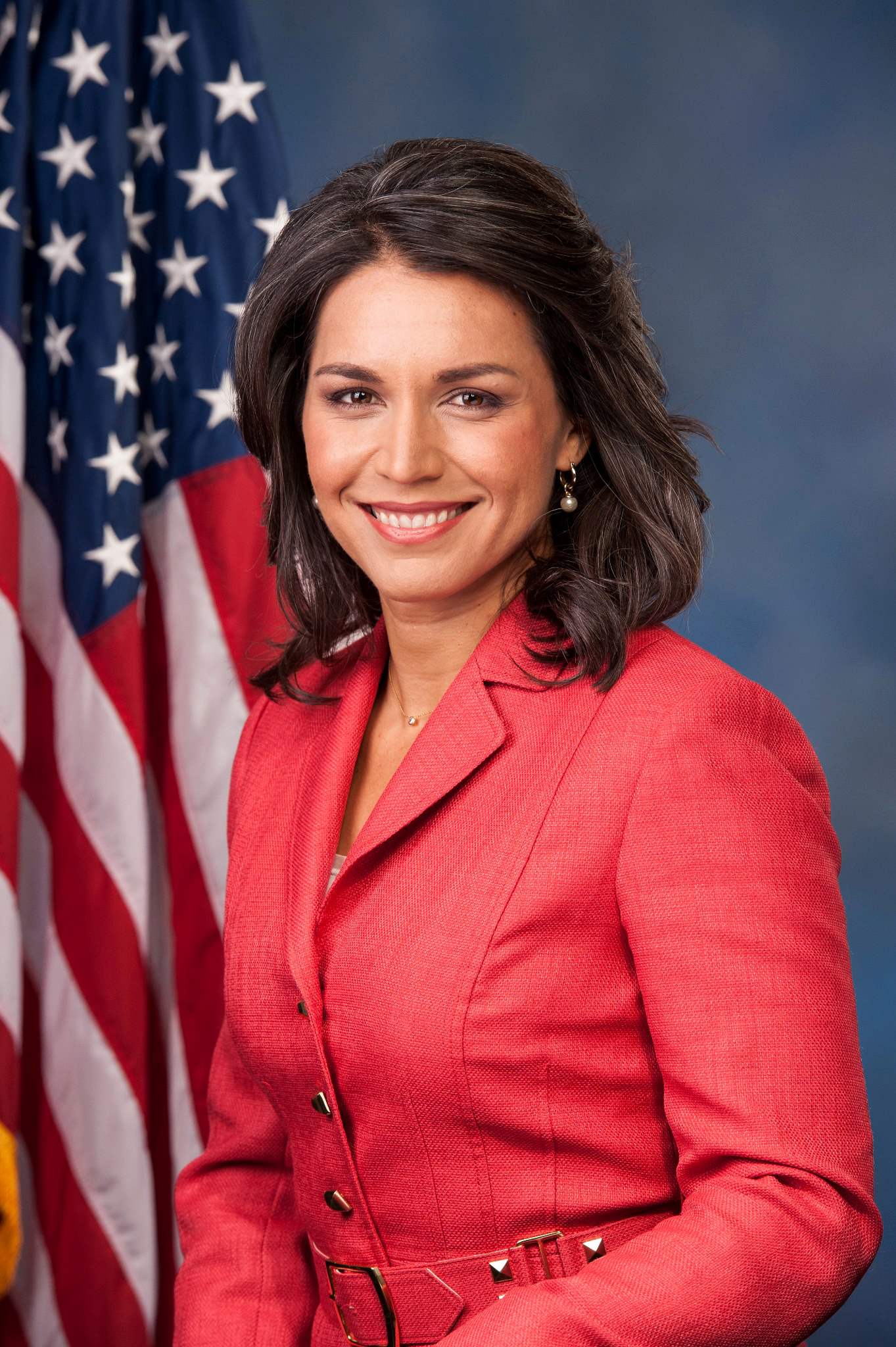
Tulsi Gabbard

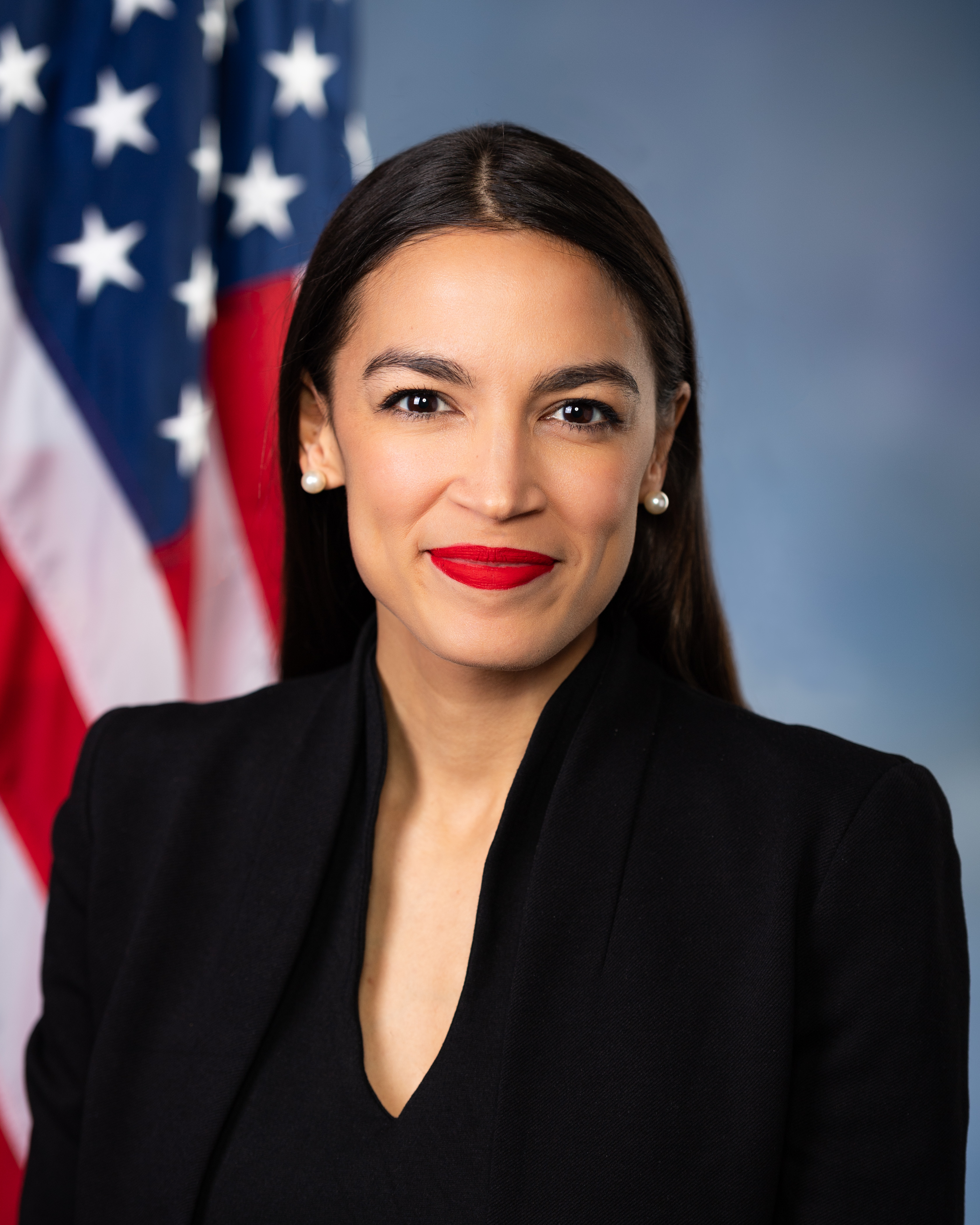
Alexandria Ocasio-Cortez

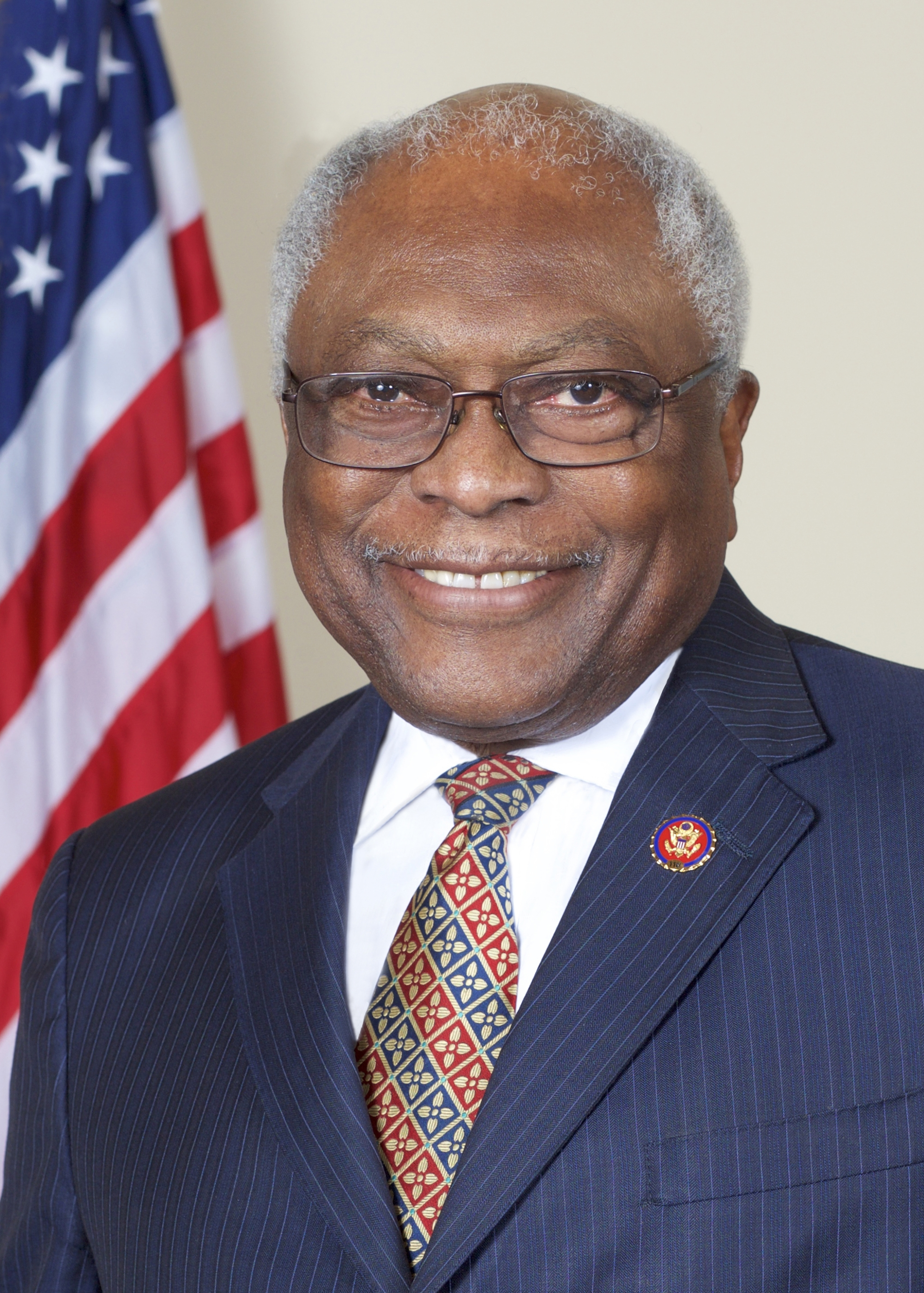
Jim Clyburn

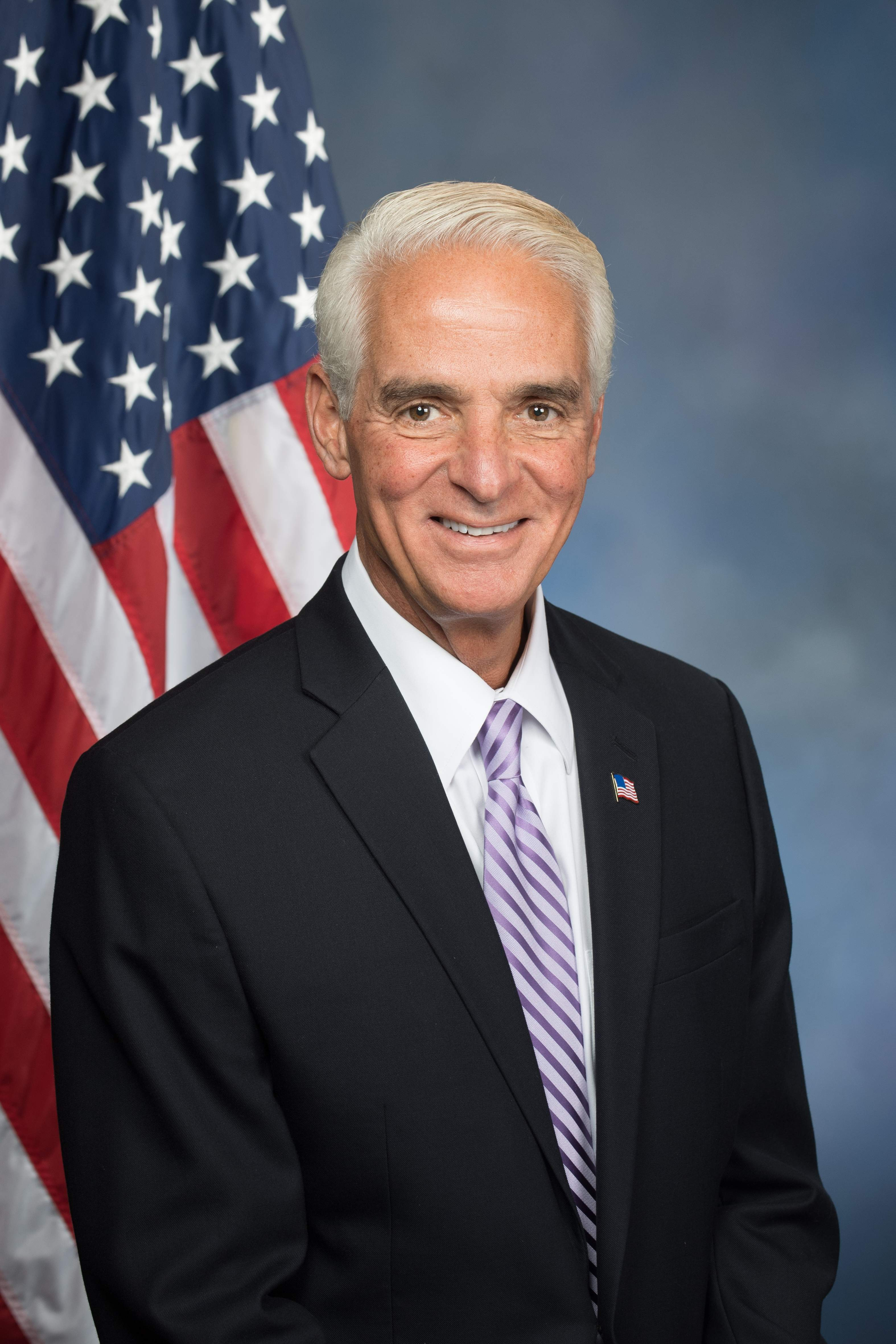
Charlie Crist

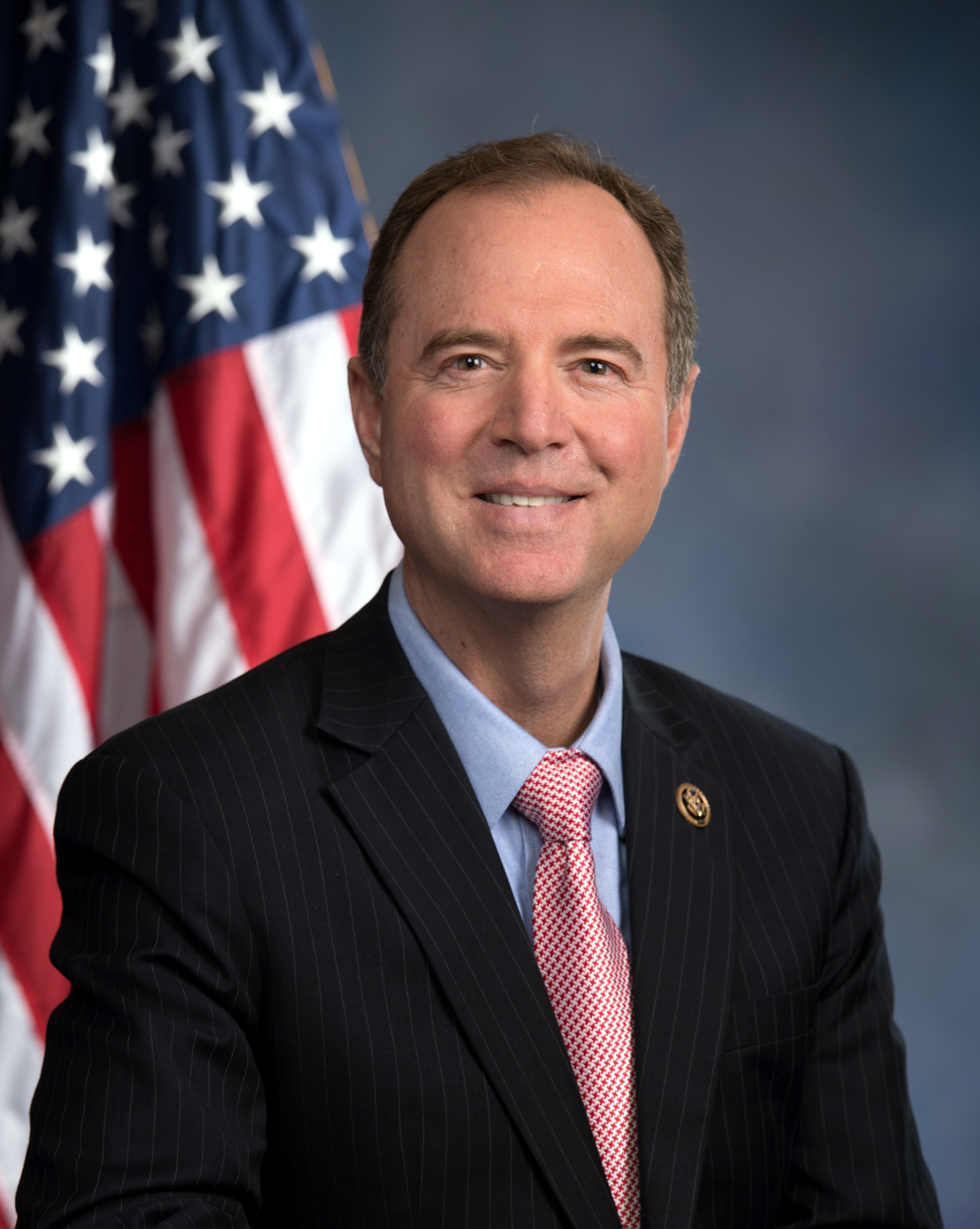
Adam Schiff

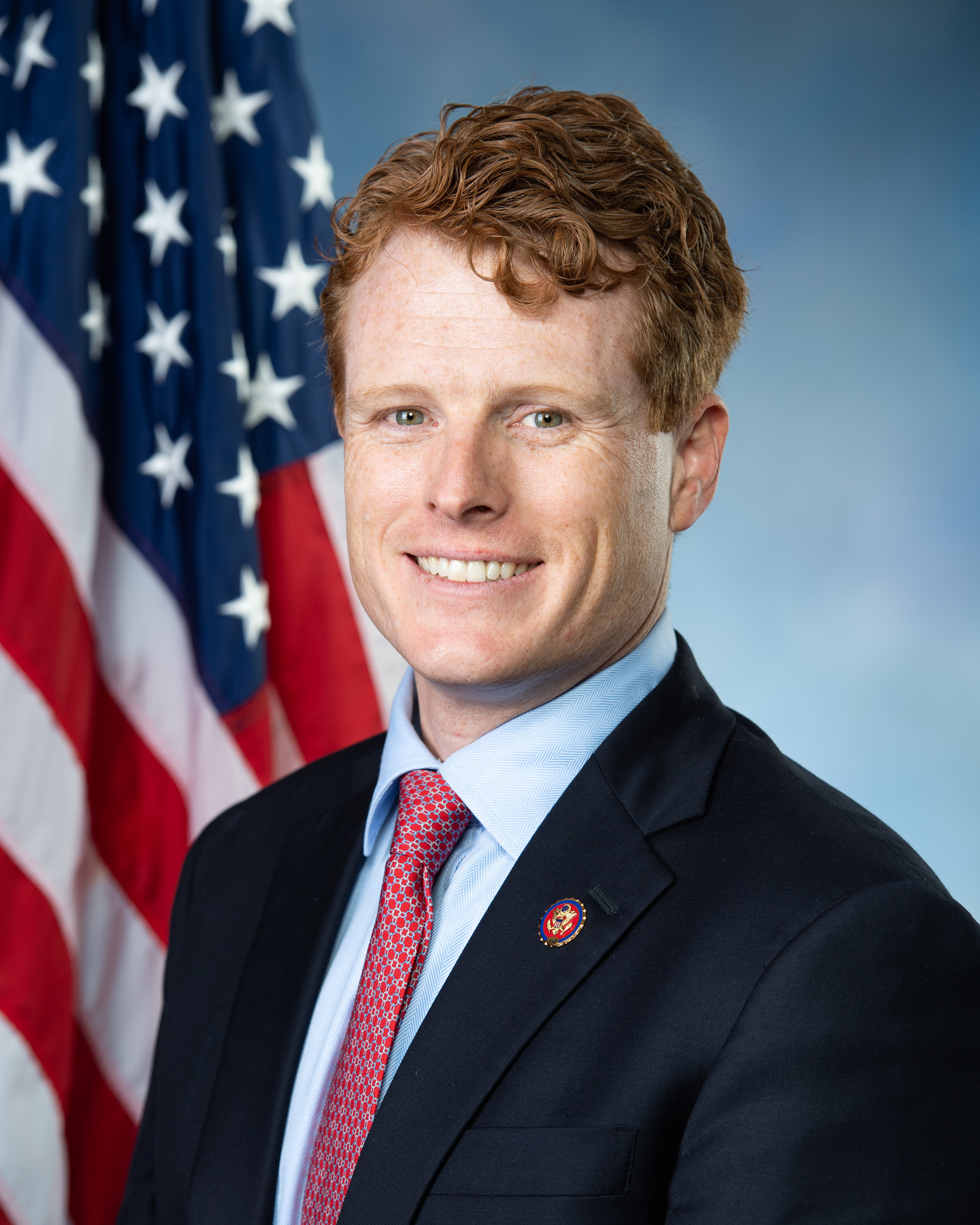
Joe Kennedy III

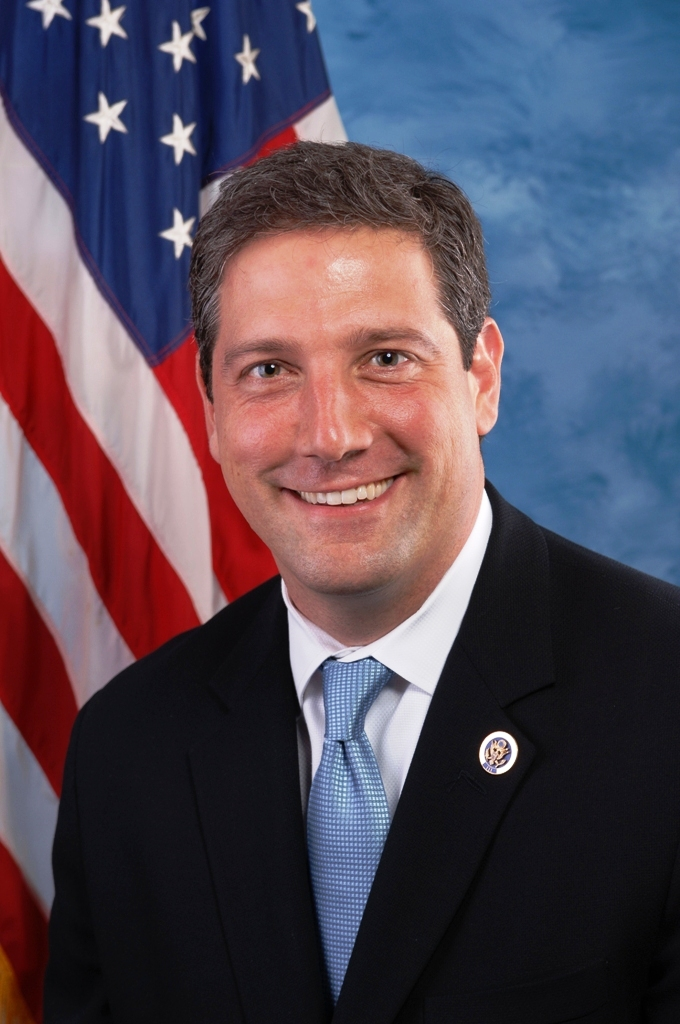
Tim Ryan

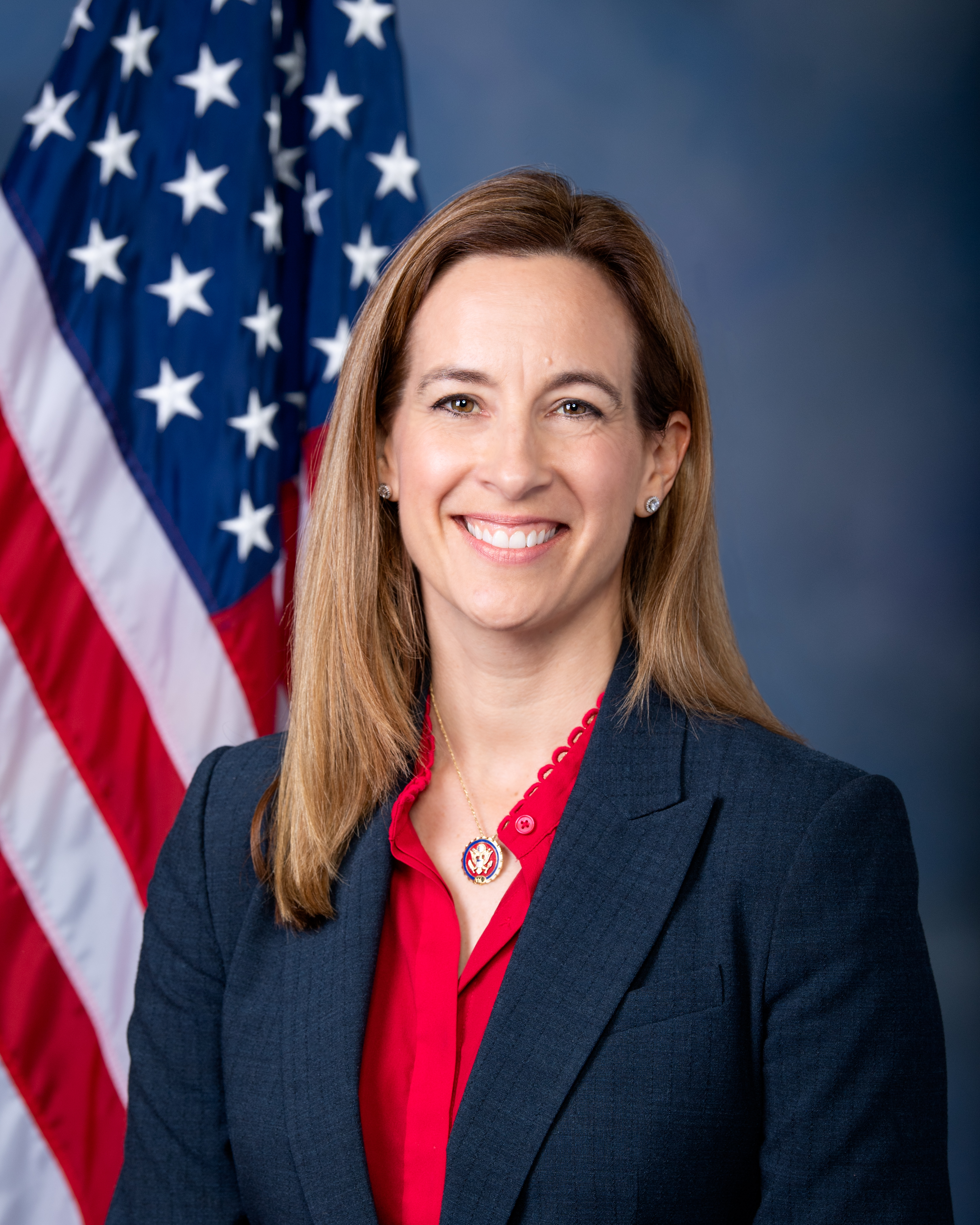
Mikie Sherrill

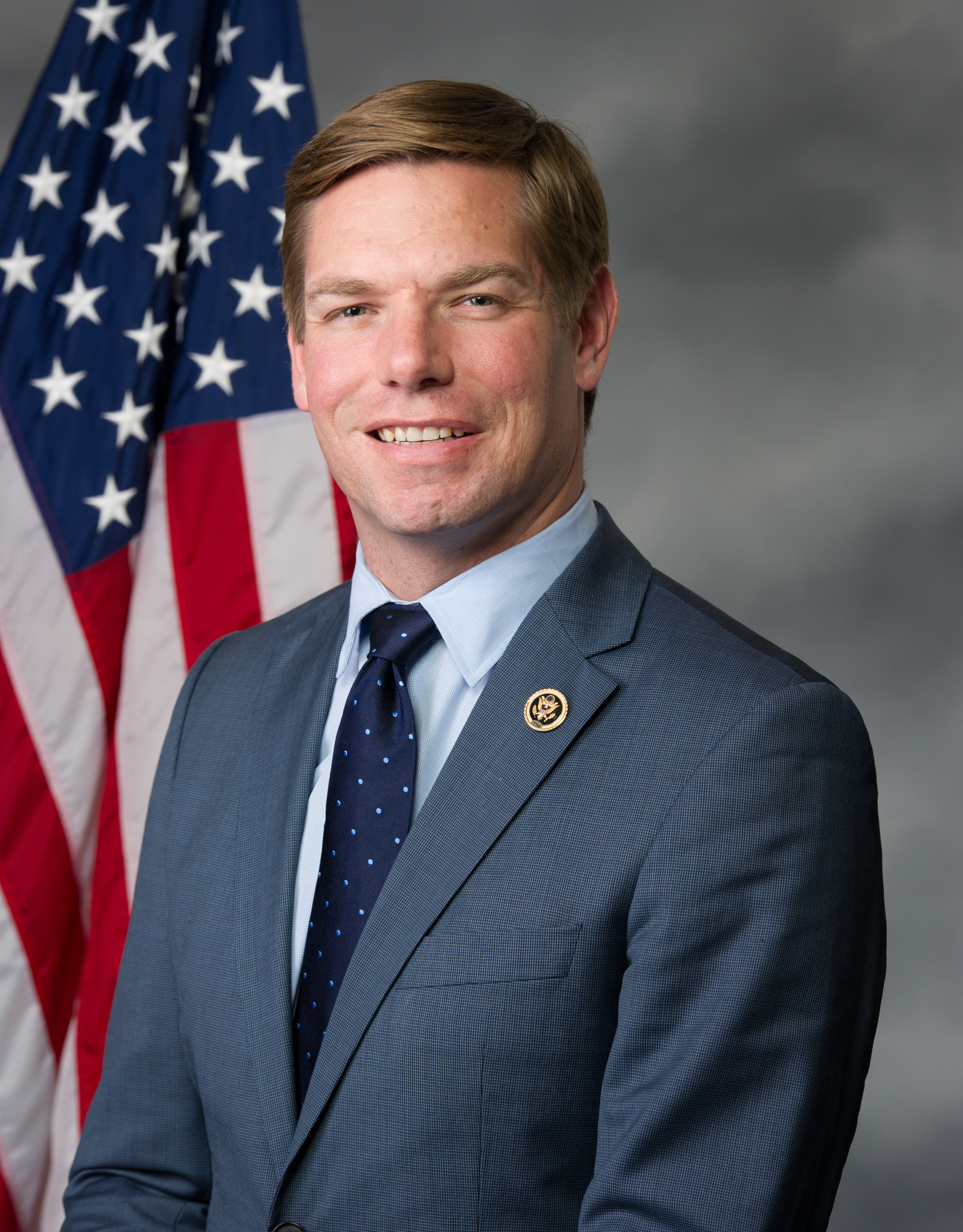
Eric Swalwell

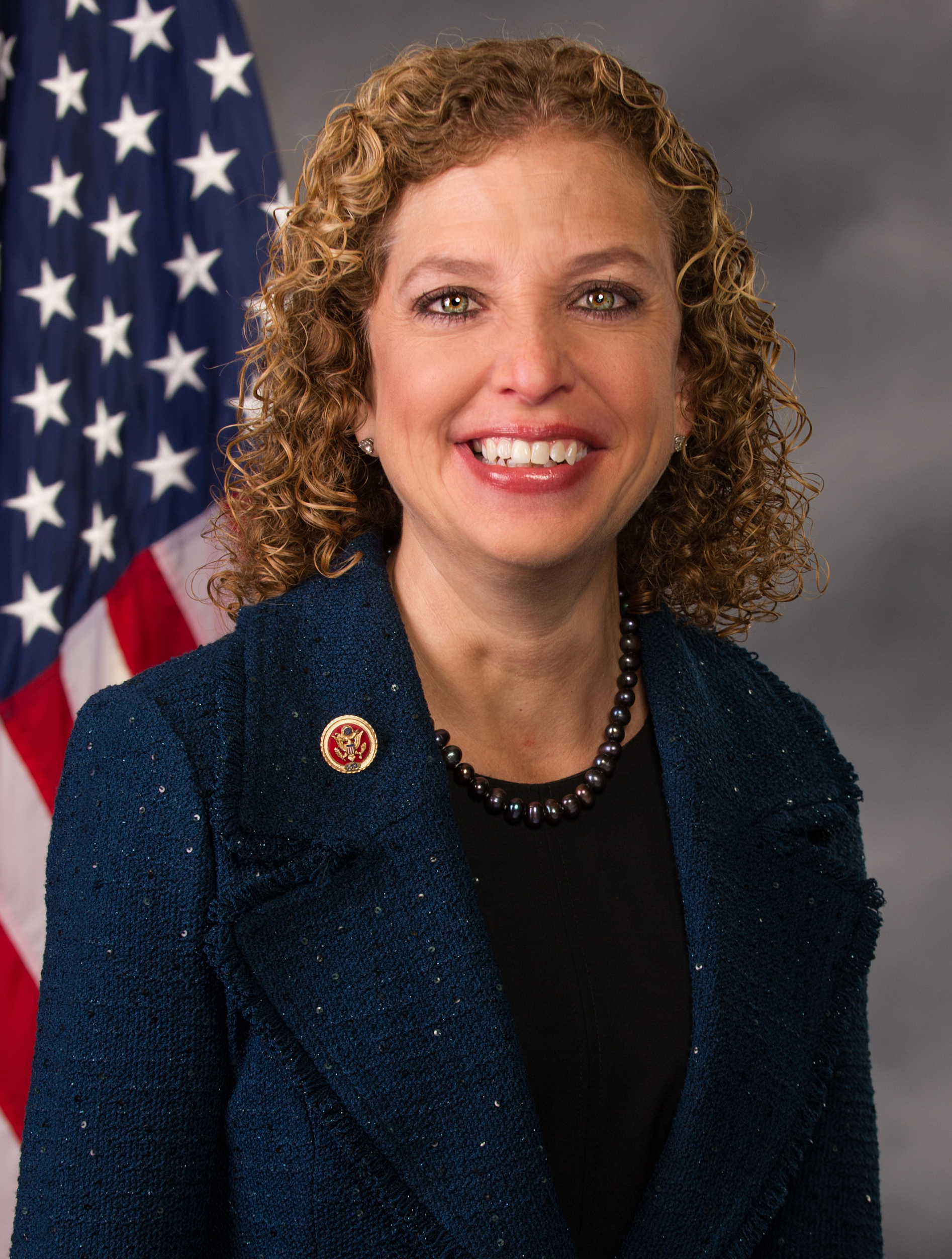
Debbie Wasserman Schultz

- Alma Adams, U.S. Representative from NC-12 (2014–present)
- Pete Aguilar, U.S. Representative from CA-31 (2015–2023) (Note: Previously endorsed Michael Bloomberg.)
- Colin Allred, U.S. Representative from TX-32 (2019–2025) (Note: Previously endorsed Julian Castro.)
- Cindy Axne, U.S. Representative from IA-03 (2019–2023)
- Karen Bass, U.S. Representative from CA-33 (2011–2013) and CA-37 (2013–2022), Chair of the Congressional Black Caucus (2019–2021), Speaker of the California State Assembly (2008–2010)
- Joyce Beatty, U.S. Representative from OH-03 (2013–present)
- Ami Bera, U.S. Representative from CA-07 (2013–2023)
- Don Beyer, U.S. Representative from VA-08 (2015–present), U.S. Ambassador to Switzerland and Liechtenstein (2009–2013), 1997 nominee for Governor of Virginia, Lieutenant Governor of Virginia (1990–1998) (Note: Previously endorsed Pete Buttigieg.)
- Sanford Bishop, U.S. Representative from GA-02 (1993–present)
- Lisa Blunt Rochester, U.S. Representative from DE-AL (2017–2025) (National Co-Chair)
- Brendan Boyle, U.S. Representative from PA-02 (2019–present) and PA-13 (2015–2019)
- Anthony Brown, U.S. Representative from MD-04 (2017–2023), 2014 nominee for Governor of Maryland, Lieutenant Governor of Maryland (2007–2015)
- Julia Brownley, U.S. Representative from CA-26 (2013–present) (Note: Previously endorsed Kamala Harris.)
- Cheri Bustos, U.S. Representative from IL-17 (2013–2023), Chair of the Democratic Congressional Campaign Committee (2019–2023), Chair of the Democratic Policy and Communications Committee (2017–2019)
- G. K. Butterfield, U.S. Representative from NC-01 (2004–2022), Chair of the Congressional Black Caucus (2015–2017)
- Tony Cárdenas, U.S. Representative from CA-29 (2013–2025)
- André Carson, U.S. Representative from IN-07 (2008–present)
- Matt Cartwright, U.S. Representative from PA-08 (2019–2025), U.S. Representative from PA-17 (2013–2019)
- Ed Case, U.S. Representative from HI-01 (2019–present) and HI-02 (2002–2007)
- Sean Casten, U.S. Representative from IL-06 (2019–present)
- Kathy Castor, U.S. Representative from FL-14 (2013–present), Chair of the House Climate Crisis Committee (2019–present)
- Joaquin Castro, U.S. Representative from TX-20 (2013–present), Chair of the Congressional Hispanic Caucus (2019–2023)
- Judy Chu, U.S. Representative from CA-27 (2013–2023) and CA-32 (2009–2013), Chair of the Congressional Asian Pacific American Caucus (2011–2025)
- David Cicilline, U.S. Representative from RI-01 (2011–2023), Chair of the Democratic Policy and Communications Committee (2019–present)
- Gil Cisneros, U.S. Representative from CA-39 (2019–2021)
- Katherine Clark, U.S. Representative from MA-05 (2013–present), Vice Chair of the House Democratic Caucus (2019–2023) (Note: Previously endorsed Elizabeth Warren.)
- Emanuel Cleaver, U.S. Representative from MO-05 (2005–present), Chair of the Congressional Black Caucus (2011–2013)
- Jim Clyburn, U.S. Representative from SC-06 (1993–present), House Majority Whip (2019–2023, 2007–2011), House Assistant Democratic Leader (2011–2019), Chair of the Congressional Black Caucus (1999–2001)
- Steve Cohen, U.S. Representative from TN-09 (2007–present)
- Lou Correa, U.S. Representative from CA-46 (2017–present), Chair of the Blue Dog Coalition for Communications (2019–present)
- Jim Costa, U.S. Representative from CA-16 (2013–2023) and CA-20 (2005–2013), Chair of the Blue Dog Coalition for Communications (2015–2017) and Administration (2017–2019)
- Joe Courtney, U.S. Representative from CT-02 (2007–present)
- TJ Cox, U.S. Representative from CA-21 (2019–2021)
- Angie Craig, U.S. Representative from MN-02 (2019–present)
- Charlie Crist, U.S. Representative from FL-13 (2017–2022), Governor of Florida (2007–2011) (Republican before 2012, now Democratic)
- Jason Crow, U.S. Representative from CO-06 (2019–present)
- Henry Cuellar, U.S. Representative from TX-28 (2005–present), Chair of the Blue Dog Coalition for Communications (2017–2019)
- Sharice Davids, U.S. Representative from KS-03 (2019–present)
- Danny Davis, U.S. Representative from IL-07 (1997–present)
- Susan Davis, U.S. Representative from CA-53 (2001–2021)
- Madeleine Dean, U.S. Representative from PA-04 (2019–present)
- Peter DeFazio, U.S. Representative from OR-04 (1987–2023), Chair of the House Transportation Committee (2019–2023)
- Diana DeGette, U.S. Representative from CO-01 (1997–present)
- Rosa DeLauro, U.S. Representative from CT-03 (1991–present), Chair of the House Democratic Steering Committee (2003–2021), House Democratic Assistant to the Leader (1999–2003)
- Val Demings, U.S. Representative from FL-10 (2017–2023)
- Ted Deutch, Chair of the House Ethics Committee (2019–2022), U.S. Representative from FL-19 (2010–2013), FL-21 (2013–2017) and FL-22 (2017–2022)
- Debbie Dingell, U.S. Representative from MI-12 (2015–present)
- Lloyd Doggett, U.S. Representative from TX-35 (2013–present), TX-25 (2005–2013), TX-10 (1995–2005), Justice of the Texas Supreme Court (1989–1994)
- Mike Doyle, U.S. Representative from PA-18 (2019–2023, 1995–2003), PA-14 (2003–2019)
- Eliot Engel, U.S. Representative from NY-16 (2013–2021), NY-17 (1993–2013), and NY-19 (1989–1993), Chair (2019–present) and Ranking Member (2013–2019) of the House Foreign Affairs Committee
- Veronica Escobar, U.S. Representative from TX-16 (2019–present) (previously endorsed Beto O'Rourke) (Note: Previously endorsed another candidate.)
- Adriano Espaillat, U.S. Representative from NY-13 (2017–present)
- Dwight Evans, U.S. Representative from PA-03 (2019–present) and PA-02 (2016–2019)
- Abby Finkenauer, U.S. Representative from IA-01 (2019–2021)
- Lizzie Fletcher, U.S. Representative from TX-07 (2019–present)
- Bill Foster, U.S. Representative from IL-11 (2013–present, 2008–2011)
- Lois Frankel, U.S. Representative from FL-21 (2017–2023) and FL-22 (2013–2017), Ranking Member of the Congressional Women's Caucus (2017–2019)
- Marcia Fudge, U.S. Representative from OH-11 (2008–2021), Chair of the Congressional Black Caucus (2013–2015)
- Tulsi Gabbard, U.S. Representative from HI-02 (2013–2021), 2020 candidate for president
- Ruben Gallego, U.S. Representative from AZ-07 (2015–2025) (previously endorsed Eric Swalwell, then Kamala Harris) (Note: Previously endorsed multiple candidates.)
- John Garamendi, U.S. Representative from CA-03 (2013–2023), Lieutenant Governor of California (2007–2009)
- Chuy García, U.S. Representative from IL-04 (2019–present) (Note: Previously endorsed Bernie Sanders.)
- Sylvia Garcia, U.S. Representative from TX-29 (2019–present)
- Jared Golden, U.S. Representative from ME-02 (2019–present) (previously endorsed Michael Bennet)
- Vicente Gonzalez, U.S. Representative from TX-15 (2017–2023)
- Josh Gottheimer, U.S. Representative from NJ-05 (2017–present), Chair of the Problem Solvers Caucus (2017–present) (previously endorsed Cory Booker, then Michael Bloomberg)
- Raúl Grijalva, U.S. Representative from AZ-03 (2013–2025) and AZ-07 (2003–2013)
- Deb Haaland, U.S. Representative from NM-01 (2019–2021)
- Josh Harder, U.S. Representative from CA-10 (2019–2023)
- Alcee Hastings, U.S. Representative from FL-20 (1993–2021), Judge of the U.S. District Court for the Southern District of Florida (1979–1989)
- Jahana Hayes, U.S. Representative from CT-05 (2019–present)
- Jim Himes, U.S. Representative from CT-04 (2009–present), Chair of the New Democrat Coalition (2017–2019)
- Eleanor Holmes Norton, U.S. Delegate from DC-AL (1991–present), Ranking Member of the Congressional Women's Caucus (1997–1999), Chair of the Equal Employment Opportunity Commission (1977–1981)
- Kendra Horn, U.S. Representative from OK-05 (2019–2021)
- Steven Horsford, U.S. Representative from NV-04 (2019–present, 2013–2015), Majority Leader of the Nevada Senate (2009–2013)
- Chrissy Houlahan, U.S. Representative from PA-06 (2019–present)
- Steny Hoyer, U.S. Representative from MD-05 (1981–present), House Majority Leader (2019–2023, 2007–2011), House Minority Whip (2011–2019, 2003–2007), House Minority Whip (2002–2003), Chair of the House Democratic Conference (1989–1995), Vice Chair of the House Democratic Conference (1989)
- Jared Huffman, U.S. Representative from CA-02 (2013–present)
- Sheila Jackson Lee, U.S. Representative from TX-18 (1995–2024)
- Pramila Jayapal, U.S. Representative from WA-07 (2017–present), Chair of the Congressional Progressive Caucus (2019–2025)
- Eddie Bernice Johnson, U.S. Representative from TX-30 (1993–2023), Chair of the Congressional Black Caucus (2001–2003)
- Hank Johnson, U.S. Representative from GA-04 (2007–present)
- Marcy Kaptur, U.S. Representative from OH-09 (1983–present)
- Robin Kelly, U.S. Representative from IL-02 (2013–present)
- Joe Kennedy III, U.S. Representative from MA-04 (2013–2021)
- Ro Khanna, U.S. Representative from CA-17 (2017–present)
- Andy Kim, U.S. Representative from NJ-03 (2019–2024) (previously endorsed Cory Booker, then Pete Buttigieg)
- Ron Kind, U.S. Representative from WI-03 (1997–2023), Chair of the New Democrat Coalition (2013–2017 and 2001–2005)
- Ann Kirkpatrick, U.S. Representative from AZ-02 (2019–2023), U.S. Representative from AZ-01 (2013–2017, 2009–2011), 2016 nominee for Senate
- Raja Krishnamoorthi, U.S. Representative from IL-08 (2016–present)
- Ann McLane Kuster, U.S. Representative from NH-02 (2013–2025)
- Conor Lamb, U.S. Representative from PA-17 (2019–2023) and PA-18 (2018–2019)
- James Langevin, U.S. Representative from RI-02 (2001–2023), Secretary of State of Rhode Island (1995–2001)
- John B. Larson, U.S. Representative from CT-01 (1999–present), Chair of the House Democratic Caucus (2009–2013), Vice Chair of the House Democratic Caucus (2006–2009)
- Brenda Lawrence, U.S. Representative from MI-14 (2015–2023), Chair of the Congressional Women's Caucus (2019–2023)
- Al Lawson, U.S. Representative from FL-05 (2017–2023)
- Barbara Lee, U.S. Representative from CA-13 (1998–2025), Chair of the Congressional Progressive Caucus (2005–2009), Chair of the Congressional Black Caucus (2009–2011)
- Susie Lee, U.S. Representative from NV-03 (2019–present)
- Andy Levin, U.S. Representative from MI-09 (2019–2023)
- Mike Levin, U.S. Representative from CA-49 (2019–present)
- Ted Lieu, U.S. Representative from CA-33 (2015–2023)
- Dan Lipinski, U.S. Representative from IL-03 (2005–2021), Chair of the Blue Dog Coalition for Policy (2017–2019)
- Dave Loebsack, U.S. Representative from IA-02 (2007–2021)
- Nita Lowey, U.S. Representative from NY-17 (2013–2021), Chair (2019–2021) and Ranking Member (2013–2019) of the House Appropriations Committee, Chair of the Democratic Congressional Campaign Committee (2001–2003), Ranking Member of the Congressional Women's Caucus (1995–1997)
- Ben Ray Luján, U.S. Representative from NM-03 (2009–2021), 2020 nominee for Senate, Assistant Speaker of the U.S. House of Representatives (2019–2021), Chair of the Democratic Congressional Campaign Committee (2015–2019)
- Elaine Luria, U.S. Representative from VA-02 (2019–2023)
- Stephen F. Lynch, U.S. Representative from MA-08 (2001–present)
- Tom Malinowski, U.S. Representative from NJ-07 (2019–2023), Assistant Secretary of State for Democracy, Human Rights, and Labor (2014–2017) (Note: Previously endorsed Cory Booker.)
- Carolyn Maloney, U.S. Representative from NY-12 (2013–2023) and NY-14 (1993–2013), Chair of the House Oversight Committee (2019–present) (previously endorsed Kirsten Gillibrand)
- Sean Patrick Maloney, U.S. Representative from NY-18 (2013–2023), White House Staff Secretary (1999–2000) (previously endorsed Beto O'Rourke)
- Doris Matsui, U.S. Representative from CA-06 (2013–2023) and CA-05 (2005–2013), Ranking Member of the Congressional Women's Caucus (2015–2017)
- Ben McAdams, U.S. Representative from UT-04 (2019–2021), Mayor of Salt Lake County, UT (2013–2019)
- Lucy McBath, U.S. Representative from GA-06 (2019–2023)
- Donald McEachin, U.S. Representative from VA-04 (2017–2022)
- Jim McGovern, U.S. Representative from MA-02 (1997–present), Chair (2019–2023) and Ranking Member (2018–2019) of the House Rules Committee
- Jerry McNerney, U.S. Representative from CA-09 (2007–2023)
- Gregory Meeks, U.S. Representative from NY-05 (1998–present)
- Kweisi Mfume, U.S. Representative from MD-07 (2020–present) and (1987–1996)
- Gwen Moore, U.S. Representative from WI-04 (2005–present), Ranking Member of the Congressional Women's Caucus (2011–2013)
- Seth Moulton, U.S. Representative from MA-06 (2015–present), 2020 candidate for president
- Debbie Mucarsel-Powell, U.S. Representative from FL-26 (2019–2021)
- Stephanie Murphy, U.S. Representative from FL-07 (2016–2023), Chair of the Blue Dog Coalition for Administration (2019–2023) (previously endorsed Beto O'Rourke then Michael Bloomberg)
- Joe Neguse, U.S. Representative from CO-02 (2019–present)
- Donald Norcross, U.S. Representative from NJ-01 (2014–present)
- Alexandria Ocasio-Cortez, U.S. Representative from NY-14 (2019–present)
- Tom O'Halleran, U.S. Representative from AZ-1 (2017–2023), Chair of the Blue Dog Coalition for Policy (2019–2023)
- Ilhan Omar, U.S. Representative from MN-05 (2019–present)
- Chris Pappas, U.S. Representative from NH-01 (2019–present)
- Bill Pascrell, U.S. Representative from NJ-09 (2013–2024), U.S. Representative from NJ-08 (1997–2013)
- Donald Payne Jr., U.S. Representative from NJ-10 (2012–2024)
- Nancy Pelosi, U.S. Representative from CA-12 (2013–2023), CA-08 (1993–2013), and CA-05 (1987–1993), Speaker of the U.S. House of Representatives (2019–2023, 2007–2011), House Minority Leader (2011–2019, 2003–2007), House Minority Whip (2002–2003), Ranking Member of the House Homeland Security Committee (2002–2003), Ranking Member of the House Intelligence Committee (2001–2003)
- Ed Perlmutter, U.S. Representative from CO-07 (2007–2023)
- Scott Peters, U.S. Representative from CA-52 (2013–2023)
- Collin Peterson, U.S. Representative from MN-07 (1991–2021), Chair (2019–2021, 2007–2011) and Ranking Member (2011–2019, 2005–2007) of the House Agriculture Committee, Chair of the Blue Dog Coalition for Policy (1995–1999) (previously endorsed Amy Klobuchar)
- Stacey Plaskett, U.S. Delegate from VI-AL (2015–present) (previously endorsed Kamala Harris, then Michael Bloomberg)
- Mark Pocan, U.S. Representative from WI-2 (2013–present), Chair of the Congressional Progressive Caucus (2017–2021)
- Katie Porter, U.S. Representative from CA-45 (2019–2025)
- Ayanna Pressley, U.S. Representative from MA-07 (2019–present), Boston City Councilor (2010–2019)
- David Price, U.S. Representative from NC-04 (1997–2023, 1987–1995)
- Mike Quigley, U.S. Representative from IL-05 (2009–present)
- Jamie Raskin, U.S. Representative from MD-08 (2017–present)
- Kathleen Rice, U.S. Representative from NY-04 (2015–2023)
- Cedric Richmond, U.S. Representative from LA-02 (2011–2021), Chair of the Congressional Black Caucus (2017–2019), House Democratic Assistant Majority Whip (2019–2021) (National Co-Chair)
- Max Rose, U.S. Representative from NY-11 (2019–2021)
- Harley Rouda, U.S. Representative from CA-48 (2019–2021)
- Lucille Roybal-Allard, U.S. Representative from CA-40 (1993–2023), Chair of the Congressional Hispanic Caucus (1999–2001)
- Raul Ruiz, U.S. Representative from CA-36 (2013–2023)
- Dutch Ruppersberger, U.S. Representative from MD-02 (2003–2025), Ranking Member of the House Intelligence Committee (2011–2015)
- Bobby Rush, U.S. Representative from IL-01 (1993–2023) (previously endorsed Kamala Harris, then Michael Bloomberg)
- Tim Ryan, U.S. Representative from OH-13 (2013–2023), 2020 candidate for president
- Gregorio Sablan, U.S. Delegate from MP-AL (2009–2025)
- Michael San Nicolas, U.S. Delegate from GU-AL (2019–2023), Territorial Senator of the Guam Legislature (2013–2019)
- John Sarbanes, U.S. Representative from MD-03 (2007–2025)
- Mary Gay Scanlon, U.S. Representative from PA-05 (2019–present)
- Adam Schiff, U.S. Representative from CA-28 (2013–2024), CA-29 (2003–2013), and CA-27 (2001–2003), Lead Manager of the Trump Impeachment (2020), Chair (2019–2023) and Ranking Member (2015–2019) of the House Intelligence Committee
- Brad Schneider, U.S. Representative from IL-10 (2017–present, 2013–2015)
- Kurt Schrader, U.S. Representative from OR-05 (2009–2023), Chair of the Blue Dog Coalition for Communications (2013–2015) and Administration (2015–2017)
- Bobby Scott, U.S. Representative from VA-03 (1993–present), Chair (2019–2023) and Ranking Member (2015–2019) of the House Education Committee
- Terri Sewell, U.S. Representative from AL-07 (2011–present)
- Donna Shalala, U.S. Representative from FL-27 (2019–2021), President of the Clinton Foundation (2015–2017), President of the University of Miami (2001–2015), U.S. Secretary of Health and Human Services (1993–2001)
- Brad Sherman, U.S. Representative from CA-30 (2013–2023), CA-27 (2003–2013), and CA-24 (1997–2003)
- Mikie Sherrill, U.S. Representative from NJ-11 (2019–2026)
- Elissa Slotkin, U.S. Representative from MI-08 (2019–2025)
- Darren Soto, U.S. Representative from FL-09 (2017–present)
- Abigail Spanberger, U.S. Representative from VA-07 (2019–2025)
- Jackie Speier, U.S. Representative from CA-14 (2013–2023) and CA-12 (2008–2013)
- Greg Stanton, U.S. Representative from AZ-09 (2019–2023), Mayor of Phoenix, AZ (2012–2018)
- Haley Stevens, U.S. Representative from MI-11 (2019–present)
- Tom Suozzi, U.S. Representative from NY-03 (2017–2023)
- Eric Swalwell, U.S. Representative for CA-15 (2013–2026), 2020 candidate for president, Chair of the House Democratic Policy Committee (2017–2022)
- Bennie Thompson, U.S. Representative from MS-02 (1993–present), Chair (2019–2023, 2007–2011) and Ranking Member (2005–2007, 2011–2019) of the House Homeland Security Committee
- Mike Thompson, U.S. Representative from CA-05 (2013–2023) and CA-01 (1999–2013)
- Dina Titus, U.S. Representative from NV-01 (2013–present) and NV-03 (2009–2011), 2006 nominee for Governor of Nevada
- David Trone, U.S. Representative from MD-06 (2019–2025) (Note: Previously endorsed John Delaney.)
- Lauren Underwood, U.S. Representative from IL-14 (2019–present)
- Juan Vargas, U.S. Representative from CA-51 (2013–present) (previously endorsed John Delaney, then Michael Bloomberg)
- Marc Veasey, U.S. Representative from TX-33 (2013–present)
- Filemon Vela Jr., U.S. Representative from TX-34 (2013–2022)
- Pete Visclosky, U.S. Representative from IN-01 (1985–2021)
- Debbie Wasserman Schultz, U.S. Representative from FL-23 (2013–2023) and FL-20 (2005–2013), Chair of the Democratic National Committee (2011–2016)
- Maxine Waters, U.S. Representative from CA-43 (2013–present), Chair (2019–2023) and Ranking Member (2013–2019) of the House Financial Services Committee, Chair of the Congressional Black Caucus (1997–1999)
- Bonnie Watson Coleman, U.S. Representative from NJ-12 (2015–present), Majority Leader of the New Jersey General Assembly (2006–2010), Chair of the New Jersey Democratic Party (2002–2006)
- Peter Welch, U.S. Representative from VT-AL (2007–2023), President pro tempore of the Vermont Senate (2003–2007, 1985–1989), 1990 nominee for Governor of Vermont
- Jennifer Wexton, U.S. Representative from VA-10 (2019–2025)
- Susan Wild, U.S. Representative from PA-07 (2018–2025)
- Frederica Wilson, U.S. Representative from FL-24 (2011–present)
- John Yarmuth, U.S. Representative from KY-03 (2007–2023), Chair (2019–2023) and Ranking Member (2017–2019) of the House Budget Committee

=== Former ===
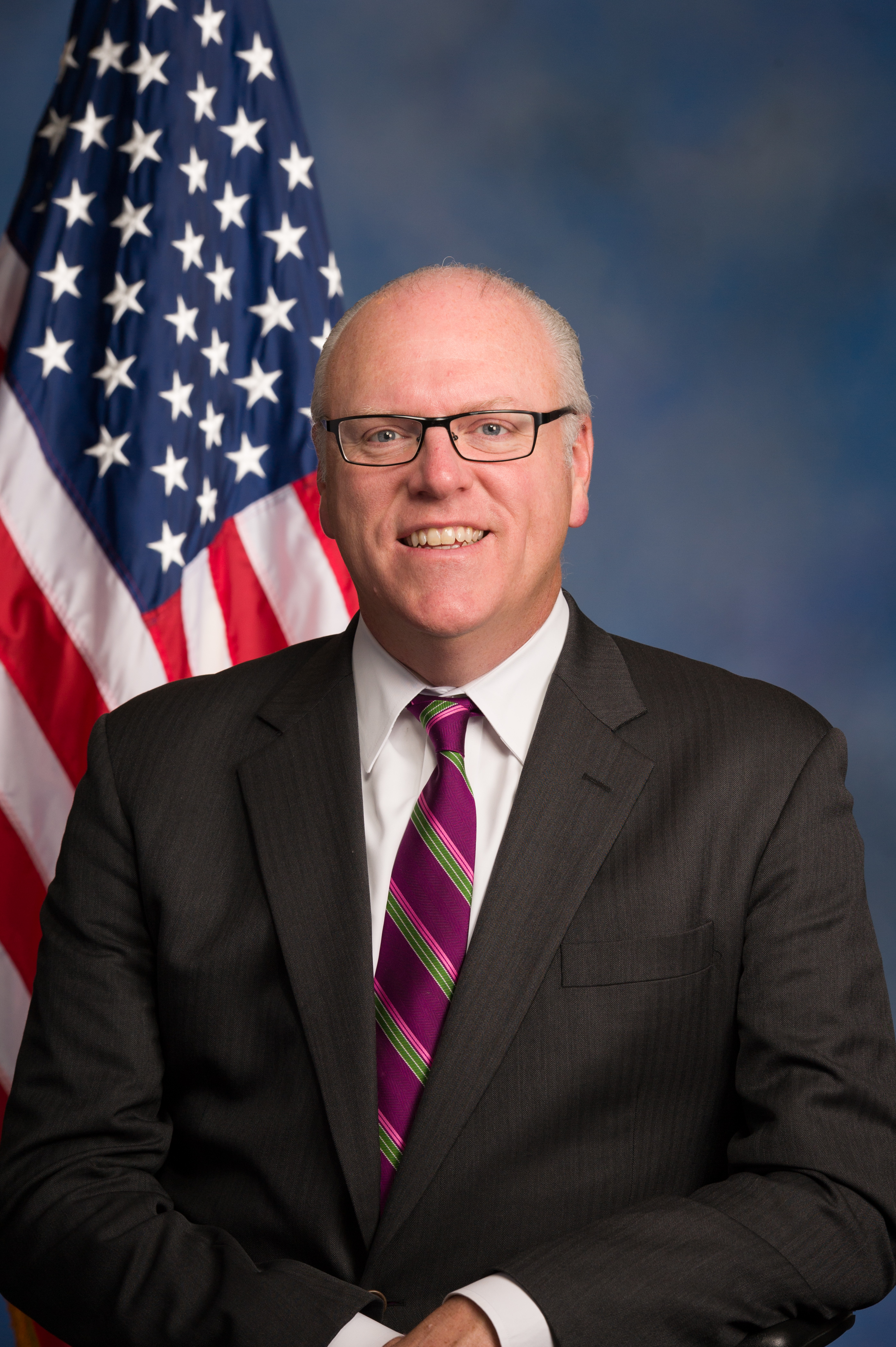
Joe Crowley

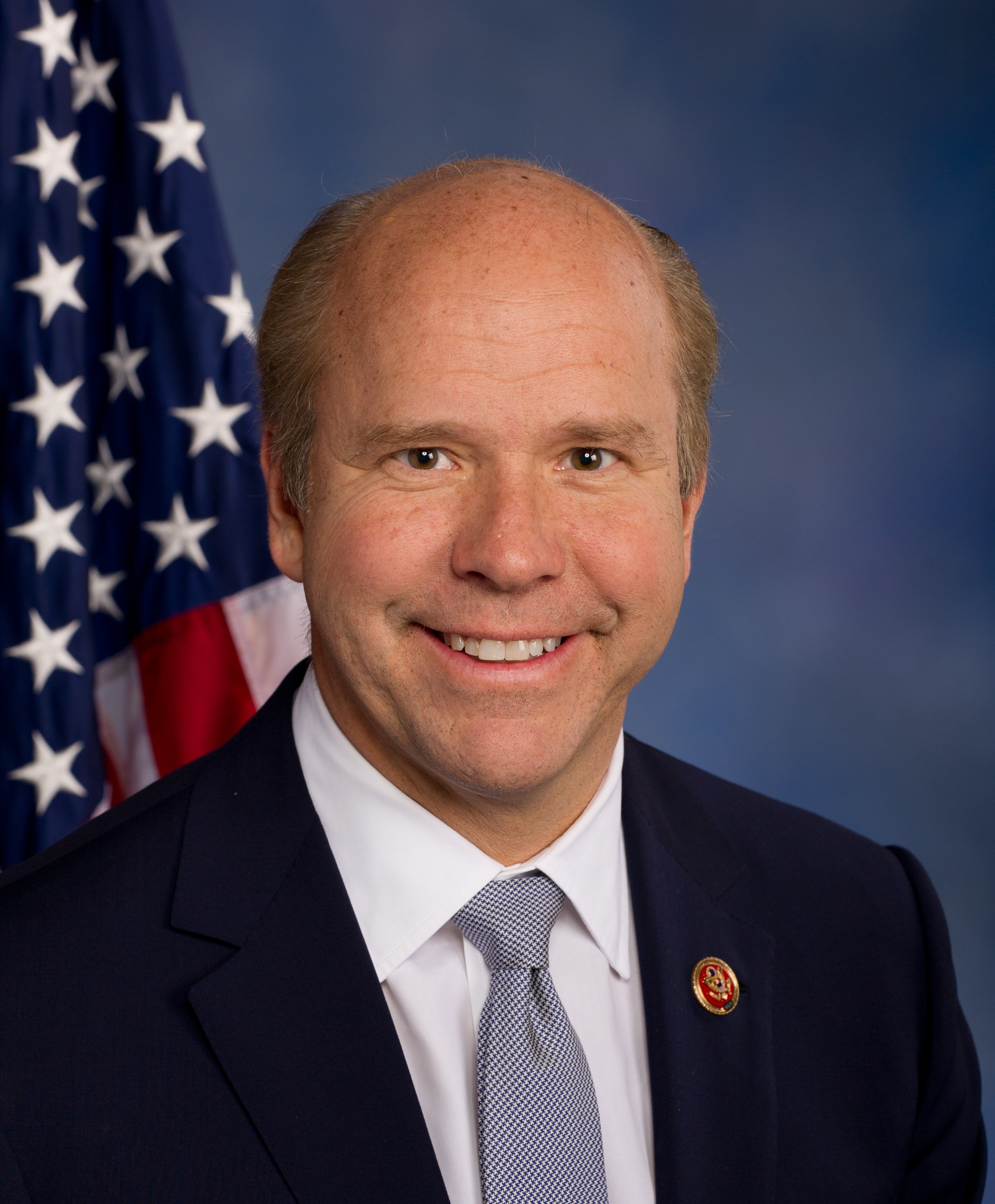
John Delaney

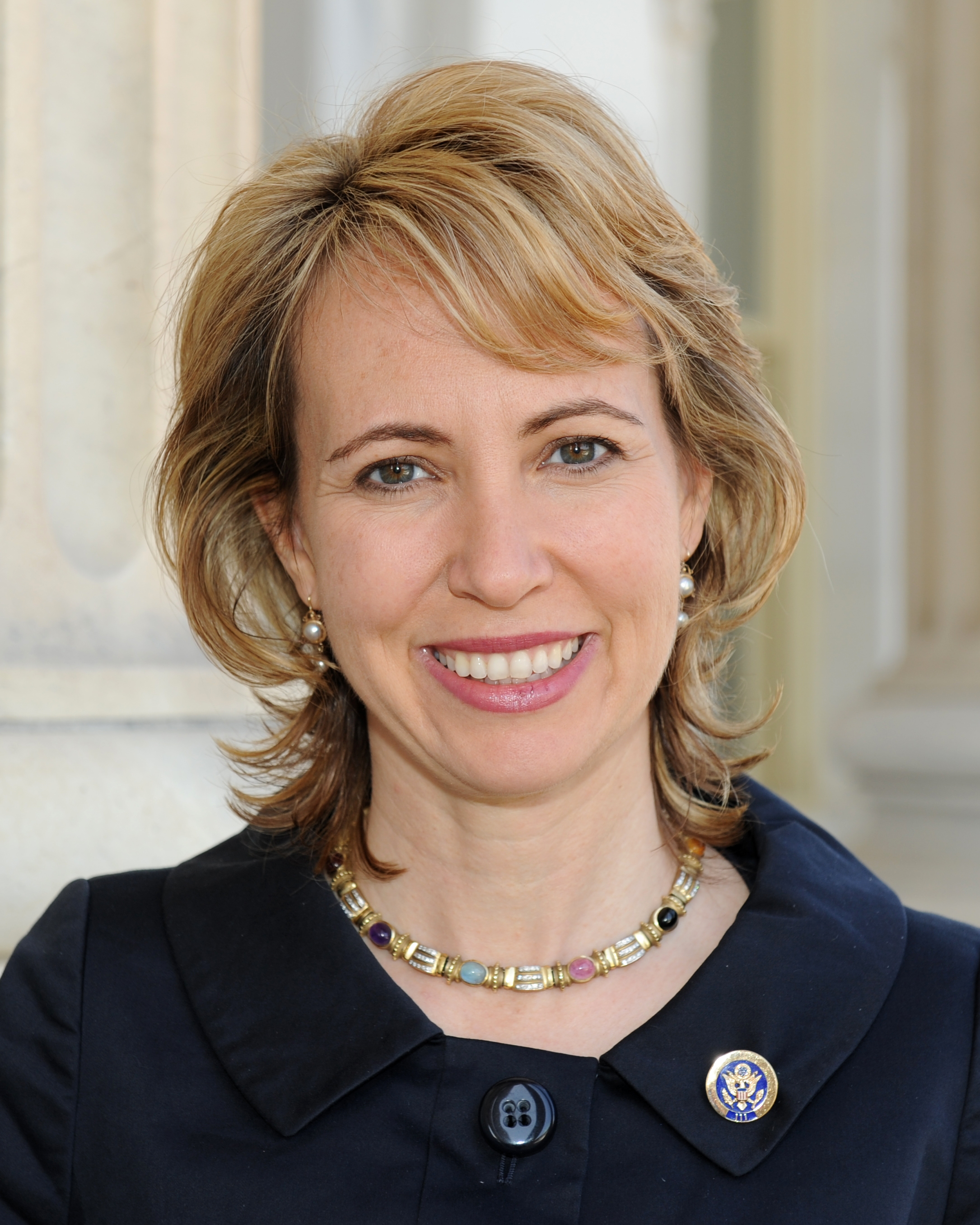
Gabby Giffords

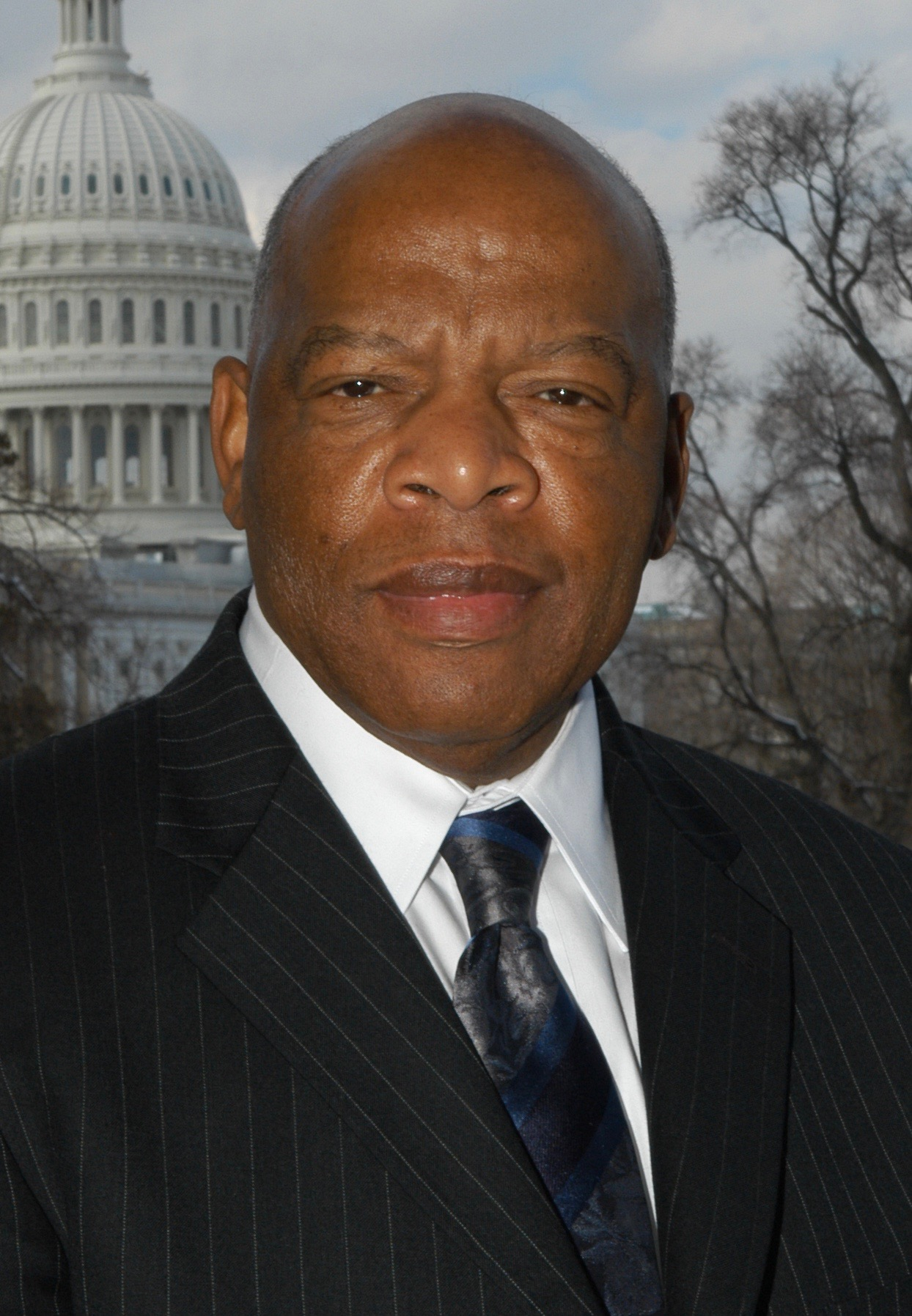
John Lewis

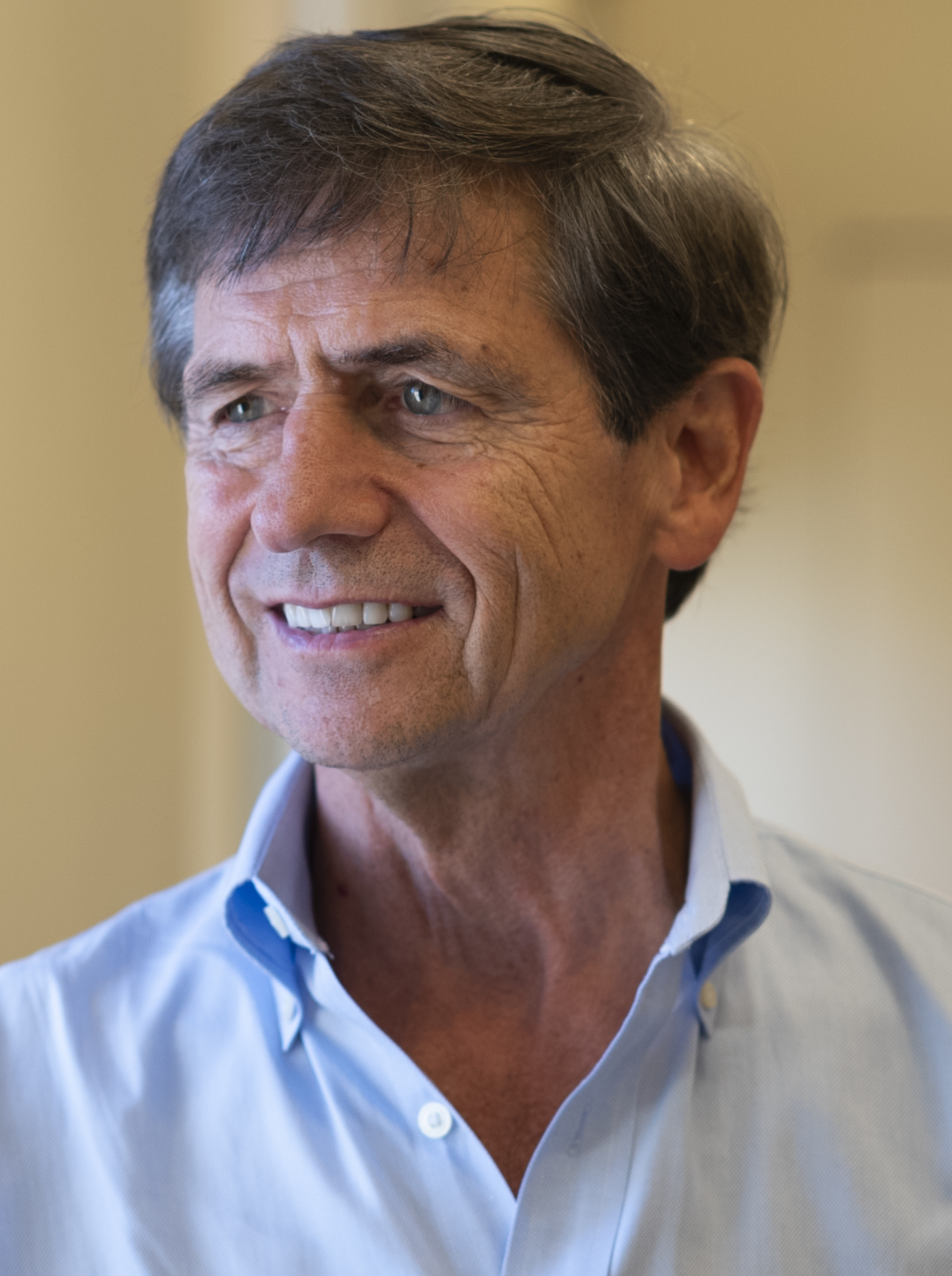
Joe Sestak

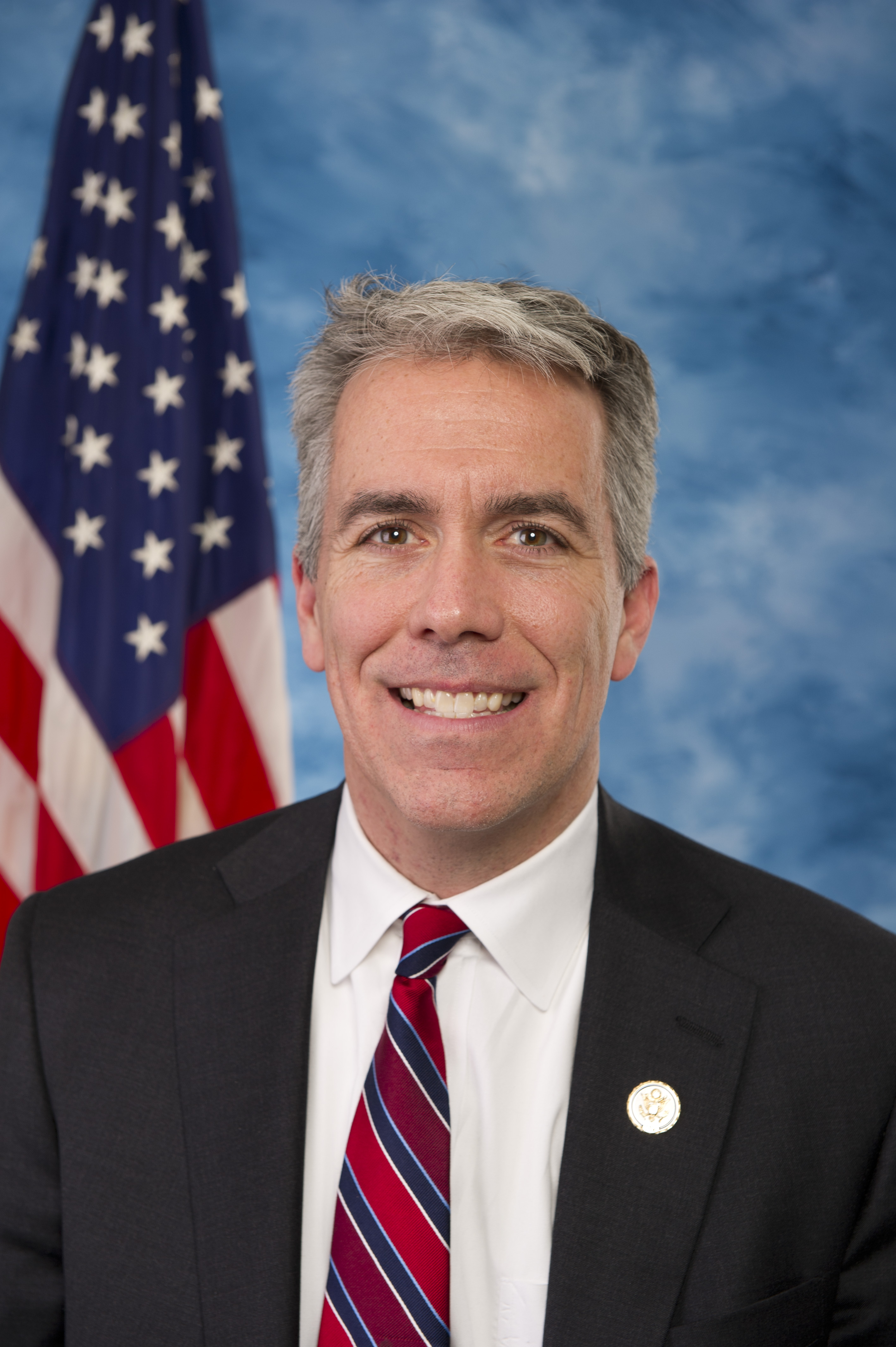
Joe Walsh

- Neil Abercrombie, Governor of Hawaii (2010–2014), U.S. Representative from HI-01 (1991–2010, 1986–1987)
- Brad Ashford, U.S. Representative from NE-02 (2015–2017)
- Brian Baird, U.S. Representative from WA-03 (1999–2011)
- John Baldacci, Governor of Maine (2003–11), U.S. Representative from ME-02 (1995–2003), Member of the Maine Senate from the 9th district (1982–94)
- Ron Barber, U.S. Representative from AZ-02 (2012–2015)
- Tom Barrett, Mayor of Milwaukee, WI (2004–present), U.S. Representative from WI-03 (1993–2003)
- Steve Bartlett, Mayor of Dallas, TX (1991–1995), U.S. Representative from TX-03 (1983–1991) (Republican)
- Shelley Berkley, U.S. Representative from NV-01 (1999–2013), 2012 nominee for Senate
- James Bilbray, U.S. Representative from NV-01 (1987–1995)
- Mike Blouin, U.S. Representative from IA-02 (1975–1979)
- Bob Borski, U.S. Representative from PA-03 (1983–2003)
- Bob Brady, U.S. Representative from PA-01 (1998–2019), Chair (2007–2011)
- Russ Carnahan, U.S. Representative from MO-03 (2005–2013)
- Chris Carney, U.S. Representative from PA-10 (2007–2011)
- Ben Chandler, U.S. Representative from KY-6 (2004–2013), Attorney General of Kentucky (1995–2003), State Auditor of Kentucky (1991–1995)
- Rod Chandler, 1992 nominee for Senate, U.S. Representative from WA-06 (1983–1993) (Republican)
- Bill Clinger, U.S. Representative from PA-05 (1993–1997), Chair of the House Oversight Committee (1995–1997) (Republican)
- Tom Coleman, U.S. Representative from MO-06 (1976–1993) (Republican)
- Joe Crowley, Chair of the House Democratic Caucus (2017–2019), Vice Chair of the House Democratic Conference (2013–2017), Chair of the New Democrat Coalition (2009–2013), U.S. Representative from NY-14 (2013–2019) and NY-7 (1999–2013)
- Buddy Darden, U.S. Representative from GA-07 (1983–1995)
- Lincoln Davis, U.S. Representative from TN-04 (2003–2011)
- Bill Delahunt, U.S. Representative from MA-10 (1997–2011)
- John Delaney, U.S. Representative from MD-06 (2013–2019), 2020 candidate for president
- Charlie Dent, U.S. Representative from PA-15 (2005–2018), Chair of the House Ethics Committee (2015–2017), Co-Chair of the Tuesday Group (2007–2018) (Republican)
- Norm Dicks, U.S. Representative from WA-06 (1977–2003)
- Charles Djou, U.S. Representative from HI-01 (2010–2011) (Republican until 2018, Independent since 2018)
- Charles Douglas, U.S. Representative from NH-02 (1989–1991), Associate Justice of the New Hampshire Supreme Court (1977–1985, 1974–1976) (Republican)
- Steve Driehaus, U.S. Representative from OH-01 (2009–2011)
- Donna Edwards, U.S. Representative from MD-04 (2008–2017)
- Mickey Edwards, U.S. Representative from OK-05 (1977–1993), Chair of the House Republican Policy Committee (1989–1993) (Republican)
- William Enyart, U.S. Representative from IL-12 (2013–2015), Adjutant General of Illinois (2007–2012)
- Bob Etheridge, U.S. Representative from NC-02 (1997–2011), North Carolina Superintendent of Public Instruction (1989–1996)
- Ed Feighan, U.S. Representative from OH-19 (1983–1993)
- Cleo Fields, U.S. Representative from LA-04 (1993–1997), Louisiana State Senator from District 14 (2020–present, 1998–2008, 1988–1993), 1995 nominee for Governor of Louisiana
- Barney Frank, U.S. Representative from MA-04 (1981–2013)
- Gabby Giffords, U.S. Representative from AZ-08 (2007–2012), founder of Giffords
- Wayne Gilchrest, U.S. Representative from MD-01 (1991–2009) (Republican before 2019, Democrat from 2019–present)
- Gwen Graham, U.S. Representative from FL-02 (2015–2017)
- Gene Green, U.S. Representative from TX-29 (1993–2019), Chair of the House Ethics Committee (2008–2009)
- Jim Greenwood, U.S. Representative from PA-08 (1993–2005) (Republican)
- Luis Gutiérrez, U.S. Representative from IL-04 (1993–2019)
- Janice Hahn, U.S. Representative from CA-36 (2011–2013) and CA-44 (2013–2016), member of the Los Angeles County Board of Supervisors from District 4 (2016–present)
- Lee H. Hamilton, U.S. Representative from IN-09 (1965–1999), Chair of the House Foreign Affairs Committee (1993–1995), Chair of the House Committee Committee (1985–1987)
- Colleen Hanabusa, U.S. Representative from HI-01 (2016–2019 and 2011–2015)
- Baron Hill, U.S. Representative from IN-09 (1999–2005 and 2007–2011)
- Katie Hill, U.S. Representative from CA-25 (2019)
- Paul Hodes, U.S. Representative from NH-02 (2007–2011), 2010 nominee for Senate (previously endorsed Marianne Williamson)
- Mike Honda, U.S. Representative from CA-15 (2001–2013) and CA-17 (2013–2017), Vice Chair of the Democratic National Committee (2005–2013), Chair of the Congressional Asian Pacific American Caucus (2004–2011) (previously endorsed Andrew Yang)
- Bob Inglis, U.S. Representative from SC-04 (2005–2011, 1993–1999), 1998 nominee for Senate (Republican)
- Steve Israel, U.S. Representative from NY-02 (2001–2013) and NY-03 (2013–2017), Chair of the Democratic Congressional Campaign Committee (2011–2015), Chair of the Democratic Policy and Communications Committee (2015–2017)
- Brenda Jones, U.S. Representative from MI-13 (2018–2019), President of the Detroit City Council (2014–present)
- Jim Kolbe, U.S. Representative from AZ-05 (1985–2003) and AZ-08 (2003–2007) (Republican before 2018, Independent since 2018)
- Steve Kuykendall, U.S. Representative from CA-36 (1999–2001) (Republican)
- Nick Lampson, U.S. Representative from TX-09 (1997–2005) and TX-22 (2007–2009)
- Larry LaRocco, U.S. Representative from ID-01 (1991–1995), 2008 nominee for Senate
- John Lewis, U.S. Representative from GA-05 (1987–2020), House Democratic Senior Chief Deputy Whip (1991–2020), Chair of the Student Nonviolent Coordinating Committee (1963–1966) (Deceased)
- David S. Mann, U.S. Representative from OH-01 (1993–1995), Mayor of Cincinnati, OH (1991–1992, 1980–1981)
- Pete McCloskey, U.S. Representatives from CA-12 (1975–83), CA-17 (1973–85) and CA-11 (1967–73)
- Mike Michaud, Representative from ME-02 (2003–2015), Member of the Maine Senate from the 9th district (1994–2003), Member of the Maine House of Representatives from the 134th district (1980–94)
- Walt Minnick, U.S. Representative from ID-01 (2009–2011), 1996 nominee for Senate
- Susan Molinari, Vice Chair of the House Republican Conference (1995–1997), U.S. Representative from NY-14 (1990–1997) (Republican)
- Jim Moran, U.S. Representative from VA-08 (1991–2015), Chair of the New Democrat Coalition (1997–2001)
- Connie Morella, U.S. Ambassador to the Organisation for Economic Co-operation and Development (2003–2005), U.S. Representative from MD-08 (1987–2003), Chair of the Congressional Women's Caucus (1995–1997) (Republican)
- Patrick Murphy, U.S. Representative from FL-18 (2013–2017), 2016 nominee for Senate
- Rick Nolan, U.S. Representative from MN-08 (2013–2019), U.S. Representative from MN-6 (1975–1981)
- Beto O'Rourke, U.S. Representative from TX-16 (2013–2019), 2018 nominee for Senate, 2020 candidate for president
- Mike Parker, Assistant Secretary of the Army for Civil Works (2001–2002), 1999 nominee for Governor of Mississippi, U.S. Representative from MS-04 (1989–1999) (Republican)
- Pedro Pierluisi, U.S. Delegate from Puerto Rico (2009–2017), candidate for Governor of Puerto Rico in 2020
- Earl Pomeroy, U.S. Representative from ND-AL (1993–2011), Insurance Commissioner of North Dakota (1985–1992)
- Jack Quinn, U.S. Representative from NY-27 (1993–2002) and NY-30 (2002–2005) (Republican)
- Charles Rangel, U.S. Representative from NY-18 (1971–1973), NY-19 (1973–1983), NY-16 (1983–1993), NY-15 (1993–2013) and NY-13 (2013–2017), Chair (2007–2010) and Ranking Member (1997–2007) of the House Ways and Means Committee, Chair of the Congressional Black Caucus (1974–1976)
- Tim Roemer, U.S. Representative from IN-03 (1991–2003), Chair of the New Democrat Coalition (1997–2001), U.S. Ambassador to India (2009–2011)
- John Salazar, U.S. Representative from CO-3 (2005–2011), Agriculture Commissioner of Colorado (2011–2014)
- Claudine Schneider, 1990 nominee for Senate, U.S. Representative from RI-02 (1981–1991) (Republican)
- Joe Schwarz, U.S. Representative from MI-07 (2005–2007) (Republican)
- Joe Sestak, U.S. Representative from PA-07 (2007–2011), 2020 candidate for president
- James Shannon, Attorney General of Massachusetts (1987–1991), U.S. Representative from MA-05 (1979–1985)
- Chris Shays, U.S. Representative from CT-04 (1987–2009) (Republican)
- Carol Shea-Porter, U.S. Representative from NH-01 (2007–2011, 2013–2015, 2017–2019)
- Ronnie Shows, U.S. Representative from MS-04 (1999–2003), Mississippi State Senator from District 42 (1980–1984) and District 41 (1984–1988)
- Heath Shuler, U.S. Representative from NC-11 (2007–2013), Chair of the Blue Dog Coalition for Administration (2011–2013)
- Peter Smith, U.S. Representative from VT-AL (1989–1991), 1986 nominee for Governor of Vermont, Lieutenant Governor of Vermont (1983–1987) (Republican)
- Neal Edward Smith, U.S. Representative from IA-05 (1959–1973) and IA-04 (1973–1995)
- Vic Snyder, U.S. Representative from AR-02 (1997–2011) (previously endorsed Amy Klobuchar)
- Richard Stallings, U.S. Representative from ID-02 (1985–1993), 1992 nominee for Senate, Chair of the Idaho Democratic Party (2005–2007)
- Alan Steelman, 1976 nominee for Senate, U.S. Representative from TX-05 (1973–1977) (Republican)
- Bart Stupak, U.S. Representative from MI-01 (1993–2011)
- Richard Swett, 1996 nominee for Senate, U.S. Representative from NH-02 (1991–1995), U.S. Ambassador to Denmark (1998–2001)
- Dave Trott, U.S. Representative from MI-11 (2015–2019) (Republican)
- Jim Guy Tucker, Governor of Arkansas (1992–1996), Lieutenant Governor of Arkansas (1991–1992), U.S. Representative from AR-02 (1977–1979), Attorney General of Arkansas (1973–1977)
- Jim Walsh, U.S. Representative from NY-27 (1989–1993) and NY-29 (1993–2009) (Republican)
- Joe Walsh, U.S. Representative from IL-08 (2011–2013), 2020 candidate for president (Former Republican, Independent since 2020)
- Robert Wexler, U.S. Representative from FL-19 (1997–2010)
- Bill Whitehurst, U.S. Representative from VA-02 (1969–1987) (Republican)
- Albert Wynn, U.S. Representative from MD-04 (1993–2008)
- Dick Zimmer, 2008 and 1996 nominee for Senate, U.S. Representative from NJ-12 (1991–1997) (Republican)
