= Opera in the Ozarks at Inspiration Point =

Opera training program in Eureka Springs, AR

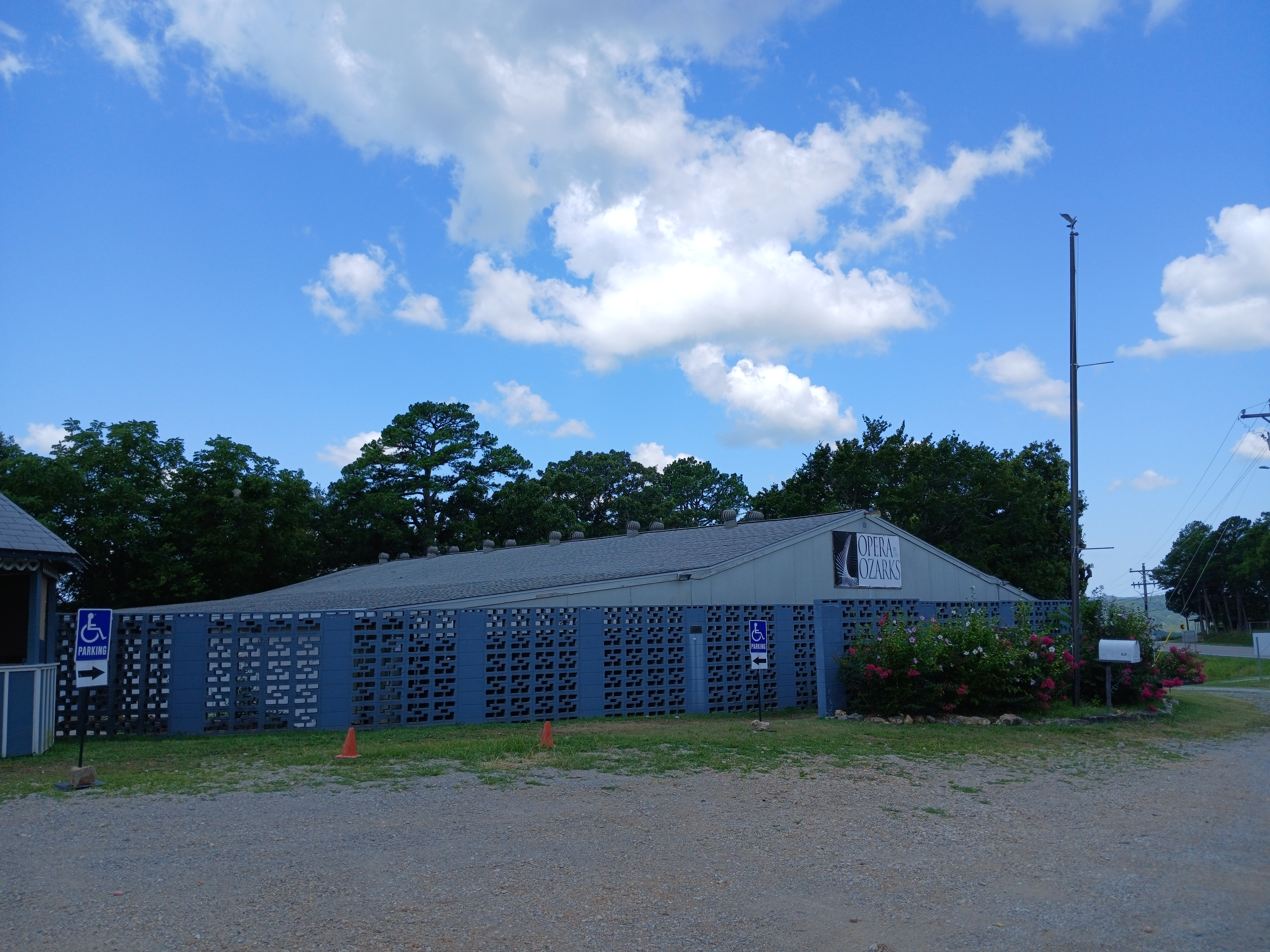
The auditorium tent used by Opera in the Ozarks until the 2024 festival season

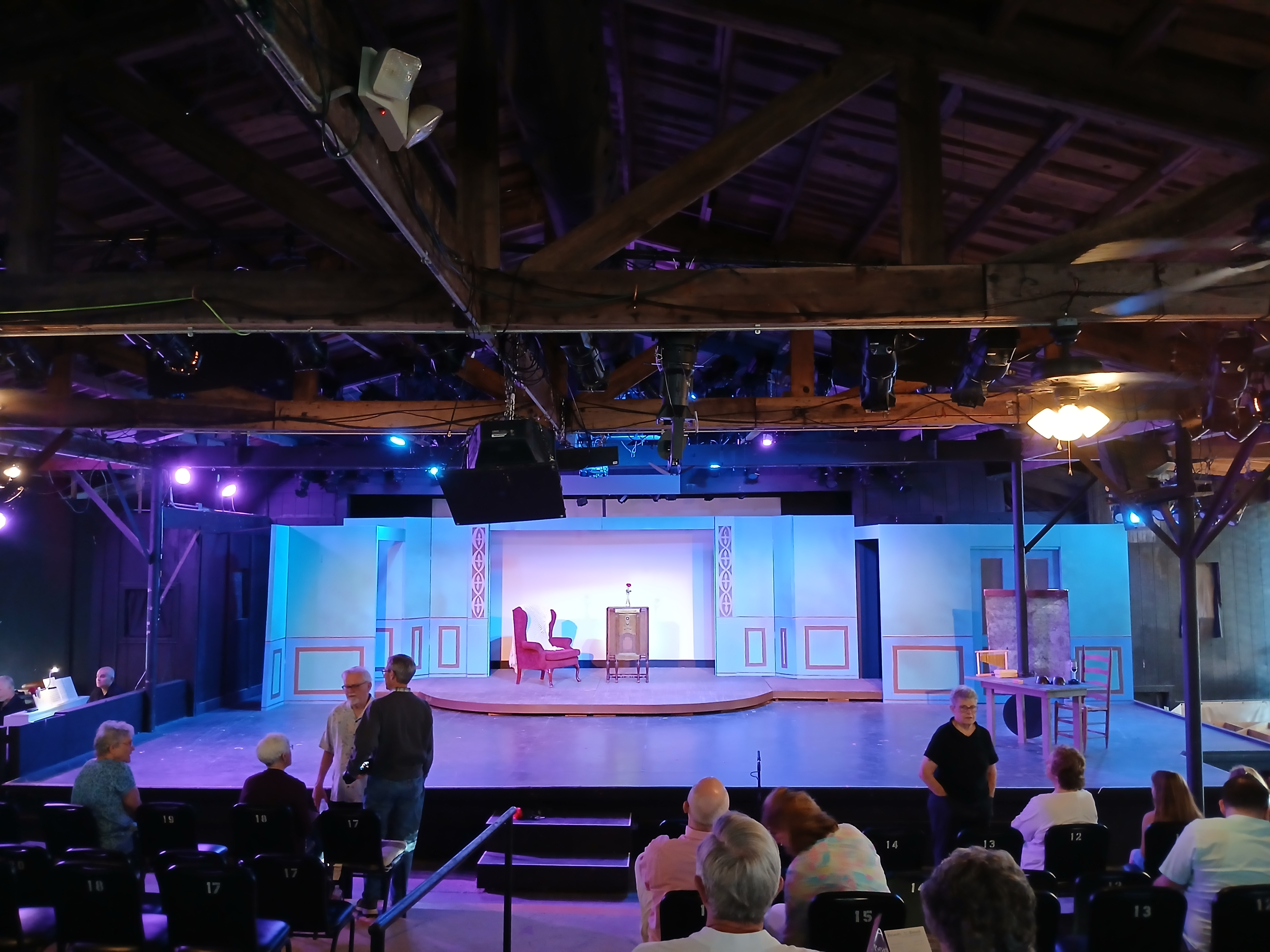
The auditorium stage before a performance of Beauty and the Beast by Vittorio Giannini in 2024

Opera in the Ozarks at Inspiration Point is an annual summer opera festival and opera training program in Eureka Springs, Arkansas. Founded in 1950 by Henry Hobart and Gertrude Stockard, the festival serves as a training ground for young opera professionals. Several alumni of the festival have gone on to have prominent performing careers, including Mark Delavan, Stephen Dickson, Tom Fox, Carroll Freeman, Beverly Hoch, Hei-Kyung Hong, Sherman Ray Jacobs, William Johns, Patricia Johnson, Gwendolyn Jones, Marquita Lister, Chris Merritt, Leona Mitchell, Brian Montgomery, Latonia Moore, Louis Otey, Kay Paschal, Cyndia Sieden, Richard Vernon, and Jennifer Zetlan.

History

Charles Mowers, a German-born engineer and inventor, came from Texas to the Ozark Mountains around 1900 to hunt wild game. He bought the land known as the Big Rock Candy Mountain in 1928 and began construction of a “castle” based on his memories of buildings along the Rhine River. Using stone quarried on the property, he incorporated an unusual building method he called Egyptian Rock Work.

After the stock market crash of 1929, Mowers abandoned his castle and returned to Texas. The castle was finished in 1932 by the Reverend Charles Scoville (1869–1938), a renowned preacher of the Disciples of Christ, who planned to use it as a retreat from his evangelistic labors. He named the site “Inspiration Point.” After his death, his widow gave the property to Phillips University in Enid, Oklahoma, for a conference and retreat center. Ten years later, however, this project was abandoned, and Henry Hobart, formerly dean of fine arts at Phillips, joined with Gertrude Stockard, director of music at Eureka Springs High School, to organize a music camp, Inspiration Point Fine Arts Colony (IPFAC), which held its first session in the summer of 1950. Hobart and his wife financed extensive repairs to the buildings with loans and donations from Eureka Springs businesses. Some furnishings were obtained from government surplus stores. Practice pianos were donated by area churches and schools.
