= Mickey Edwards =

American politician (born 1937)

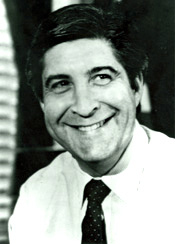

Chair of the House Republican Policy Committee
- In office January 3, 1989 – January 3, 1993
- Leader: Bob Michel
- Preceded by: Jerry Lewis
- Succeeded by: Henry Hyde

Chair of the House Republican Research Committee
- In office June 4, 1987 – January 3, 1989
- Leader: Bob Michel
- Preceded by: Jerry Lewis
- Succeeded by: Duncan L. Hunter

Member of the U.S. House of Representatives from Oklahoma's 5th district
- In office January 3, 1977 – January 3, 1993
- Preceded by: John Jarman
- Succeeded by: Ernest Istook

Personal details
- Born: Marvin Henry Yanowsky; July 12, 1937 (age 89) Cleveland, Ohio, U.S.
- Party: Republican (before 2021); Independent (2021–present)
- Spouse(s): Sue Lindley; Lisa Reagan; Elizabeth Sherman; 2 others
- Education: University of Oklahoma (BA); Oklahoma City University (JD)

Marvin Henry "Mickey" Edwards (born July 12, 1937) is an American politician who was a Republican member of the U.S. House of Representatives, serving Oklahoma's 5th congressional district from 1977 to 1993.

Edwards was a founding trustee of The Heritage Foundation and national chairman of the American Conservative Union. He taught at Harvard Kennedy School and Harvard Law School and was a regular commentator for NPR's All Things Considered.

After leaving Congress, Edwards became a critic of the rightward turn in the Republican Party. He left the GOP in 2021, and has publicly supported Democratic presidential candidates in 2020 and 2024.

== Early life and career ==
Edwards was born July 12, 1937, in Cleveland, Ohio. He earned a B.A. in Journalism from the University of Oklahoma in 1958 and a J.D. from Oklahoma City University School of Law in 1969, and was admitted to the Oklahoma bar in 1970. Edwards served as a reporter and editor at the Oklahoma City Times from 1958 to 1963, engaged in advertising and public relations from 1963 to 1968 and was a magazine editor from 1968 to 1973. From 1973 to 1974 he served as a legislative assistant for the Republican Steering Committee in Washington, D.C., and he was an instructor in law and journalism at Oklahoma City University in 1976.

== Political career ==
=== Early political involvement ===
During his collegiate days, Edwards was a member of the OU Young Republicans; years later, he recalled that it was "easily the smallest club on campus" at the time. Not long after graduating from OU, Edwards registered to vote for the first time, as a Republican. He did so in an era when the GOP barely existed in Oklahoma; at the time, the Democrats held both Senate seats, a majority of the state's congressional delegation, every statewide elected office, and a nine-to-one supermajority in the state legislature. He recalled that when he registered to vote, registration officials tried to talk him out of it, but he refused.

While working for the Times, Edwards worked to build the GOP both at the state and national level, serving as chairman of the Oklahoma City Young Republicans, then as chairman of the Oklahoma Young Republicans, then as national vice chairman of the Young Republicans. During this time, he was elected to the national board of the nascent American Conservative Union. Eventually, his party activism progressed to the point that the managing editor of the Times told him to choose between his activism and his career in journalism; he chose the former.

=== Congressional campaigns ===
In 1974, Edwards ran as a Republican for a seat in the U.S. House of Representatives. He challenged the Democratic incumbent John Jarman, who had held the seat for 24 years. Edwards raised almost no money, and spent only $30,000 for the entire cycle. Despite this, he held Jarman to 51 percent of the vote in what was mostly a bad year for Republicans because of the Watergate Affair. However, Oklahoma City had been trending Republican for some time. Edwards's campaign slogan was "Take a bite out of Big Government" and featured Edwards biting an apple on camera.

Jarman switched parties and became a Republican in January 1975 in protest of several older conservative Democrats being stripped of their committee chairmanships. Jarman did not run for reelection in 1976. That year Edwards defeated former State Attorney General G. T. Blankenship for the Republican nomination and narrowly defeated Democratic businessman Tom Dunlap, the son of the academic E. T. Dunlap, by 3,900 votes. He was the first Republican elected to represent this district in over half a century. However, he would never experience another general election that close in a district that rapidly became one of the most Republican urban districts in the country.

=== Tenure in Congress ===
During Edwards's 16 years in Congress, he served variously on the House Budget and Appropriations committees and was the ranking member of the Appropriations Subcommittee on Foreign Operations. He was also a member of the House Republican leadership, serving as the chairman of the House Republican Policy Committee, the party's fourth-ranking leadership position. However, in 1992, he was defeated in the Republican primary, by this time the real contest in the district. He failed even to make the runoff, finishing third behind State Representative Ernest Istook and former federal prosecutor Bill Price. Istook went on to win in November. The loss was mostly because of his involvement in the House banking scandal since he had written some 386 overdrafts totaling $54,000.

=== Party leadership and activism ===
Edwards was one of three founding trustees of The Heritage Foundation and the national chairman of the American Conservative Union. Along with former White House Counsel Lloyd Cutler, he has served as co-chairman of Citizens for Independent Courts, a national organization devoted to preserving judicial independence, and as co-chairman with another former White House Counsel, Abner Mikva, of Citizens for the Constitution, a national organization concerned with limiting the use of constitutional amendments as a substitute for the normal legislative process. Edwards has also served as co-chairman of a Brookings Institution/Council on Foreign Relations Task Force on Resources for International Affairs as well as the Brookings Working Group on Campaign Finance Reform and for five years as chairman of the annual Conservative Political Action Conference. He has served on the board of directors of the Constitution Project and was the director of the congressional policy task forces advising Ronald Reagan's 1980 presidential campaign.

=== Later political involvement and endorsements ===
In 2002, Edwards gave a $250 contribution to Tom Cole, a Republican candidate for Congress from Oklahoma. According to the Federal Elections Committee this was his only political contribution to any Republican candidate. In a radio interview on Fresh Air with Terry Gross on November 5, 2008, Edwards said that he had voted for Barack Obama in the 2008 general election. He endorsed Joe Biden in 2020 and left the Republican Party after the storming of the United States Capitol, saying the GOP had become "a cult" devoted to Donald Trump. He endorsed Kamala Harris ahead of the 2024 election.

== Academic career ==
After leaving Congress, Edwards taught at Harvard Kennedy School and Harvard Law School for 11 years, where he was the first John Quincy Adams Lecturer in Legislative Politics. He taught courses on Congress, political leadership, issue advocacy, election strategies, conservative political theory, and the constitutional separation of powers. In 1997, he was selected by students as the outstanding teacher at the Kennedy School. He has also served as a visiting professor at Georgetown University.

Edwards was a lecturer of Public and International Affairs at Princeton University's Woodrow Wilson School of Public and International Affairs and a member of the Princeton Project on National Security. He taught courses on "How to Win Elections" and "Congress and the Constitution." He was also a Vice President of the Aspen Institute and Director of the Aspen Institute-Rodel Fellowships in Public Leadership.

As of 2009, Edwards teaches courses on National Security Policy and the Politics of U.S. Foreign Policy at the Elliott School of International Affairs at The George Washington University. In 2013 Edwards was appointed a National Constitution Center – Penn Law Visiting Fellow.

== Author and commentator ==
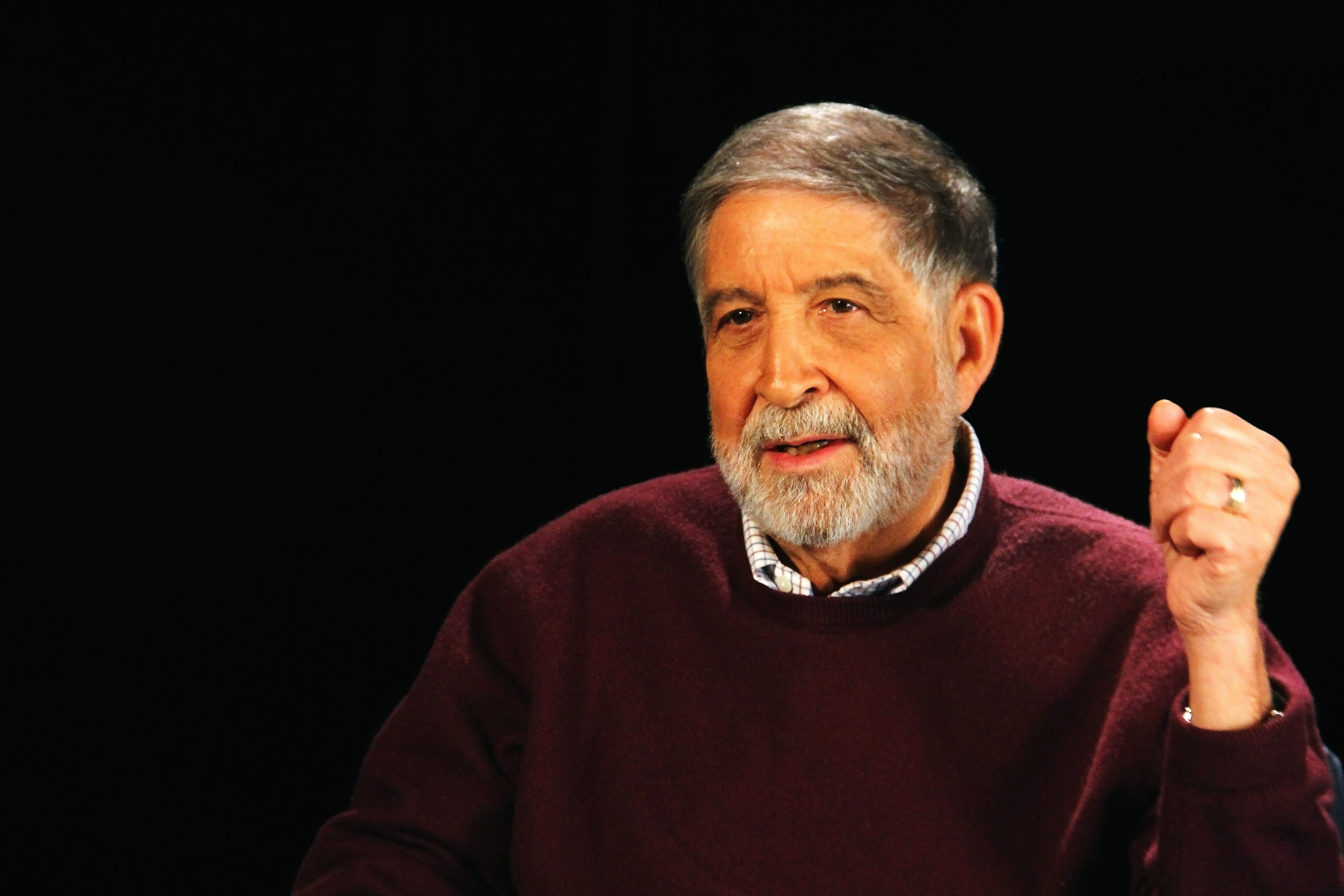
Edwards on A Conversation With... (2013)

As a notable dissident Republican leader often critical of Republican officeholders, Edwards has been a regular political commentator on NPR's All Things Considered. His newspaper columns have appeared in the Chicago Tribune and Los Angeles Times, for which he has been a regular weekly columnist, and frequently in such other publications as The New York Times, The Washington Post, The Boston Globe, San Francisco Examiner, Miami Herald and The Wall Street Journal. A well-known public speaker, he has spoken on many college campuses, including Boston College, Tulane University, West Point, University of Notre Dame, Duke University, Grinnell College, New York University, MIT, Georgetown University, American University, University of Southern California, the University of Iowa, the University of Texas, and many others.

Edwards has also authored numerous books and articles: "The Modern Conservative Movement" (2006), "Is Congress Gaining the Upper Hand? – Or is the Power of the President Dominant – A Century Foundation Essay," (2003), "Foreign Assistance and Foreign Policy (The Heritage Lectures)" (1987), "Behind Enemy Lines: A Rebel in Congress Proposes a Bold New Politics for the 1980s" (1983), "Hazardous to Your Health: A New Look at the Health Care Crisis in America" (1972). He co-authored "Winning the Influence Game: What Every Business Leader Should Know About Government" (2001) and "Financing America's Leadership: Protecting American Interests and Promoting American Values" (1997). "Reclaiming Conservatism" was issued in February, 2008, by Oxford University Press. His latest book, "The Parties Vs. the People: How to Turn Republicans and Democrats into Americans" (2012), is published by Yale University Press.

In 2009, along with former Congressman Chris Shays from Connecticut, Edwards criticized the Republican Party for neglecting what they characterized as the constitutional abuses perpetrated by the George W. Bush administration. He is also a contributor at The Bulwark, an anti-Trump news and opinion website.

On January 13, 2021, Edwards published an article in The Bulwark chronicling his decades of commitment to the Republican Party and also declaring his departure from the GOP. He stated that he had left the party due to changes that he had witnessed in the previous four years, principally the claims that the 2020 election had been tainted by fraud.

== Personal ==
Edwards was born in Cleveland, Cuyahoga County, Ohio, on July 12, 1937, and spent most of his early years in the southside Capitol Hill section of Oklahoma City, where his father, Eddie Edwards, managed a shoe store. When Mickey Edwards was 19, a gunman armed with a sawed-off rifle confronted him as he went to deposit the shoe store's earnings at the bank. Edwards told the man to "Go to hell". The man shot Edwards twice near the heart; Edwards was discharged from the hospital after three days.

Edwards has been married and divorced 5 times. He was previously married to Miss Oklahoma Lisa Reagan, a singer and composer from Oklahoma City. Edwards is presently married to Elizabeth A. Sherman, a professor of politics at American University. Edwards is Jewish.

Edwards has three children and four grandchildren.

== See also ==
- List of Jewish members of the United States Congress

U.S. House of Representatives
Preceded by John Jarman	Member of the U.S. House of Representatives from Oklahoma's 5th congressional district 1977–1993	Succeeded by Ernest Istook
Party political offices
Preceded by Jerry Lewis	Chair of the House Republican Research Committee; 1987–1989	Succeeded by Duncan L. Hunter
Preceded by Jerry Lewis	Chair of the House Republican Policy Committee; 1989–1993	Succeeded by Henry Hyde
U.S. order of precedence (ceremonial)
Preceded by Ed Perlmutter as Former U.S. Representative	Order of precedence of the United States as Former U.S. Representative	Succeeded by John Shadegg as Former U.S. Representative
