= Lisa Reagan =

American musician, composer, and voice professor

- Born: Nichols Hills, Oklahaoma
- Genres: Opera; classical; new age; ambient; jazz; pop
- Occupations: Singer; musician; composer; voice professor
- Instrument: Piano
- Website: lisareagan.com

Lisa Reagan is an American singer, musician, composer, and professor of voice. She has released eight albums in musical genres from classical to new age. She performed with the Washington National Opera for more than 20 years.

== Early life and education ==
As a child in Oklahoma City, Reagan caught the attention of and studied under Dr. Clarence Burg, Dean of Music and professor of piano at Oklahoma City University. She took acting classes at the historic Mummers Theater, and studied voice with Florence Birdwell, who taught Kristin Chenoweth and Kelli O'Hara. After obtaining her bachelor's degree in voice and piano at Oklahoma City University, Reagan earned a master's in opera and vocal performance from the University of Maryland's Opera Studio. Reagan was also Miss Oklahoma on her first try, having just turned 19 in that year's Miss America Pageant.

== Career ==
Reagan shared the stage during her two-decade residency at the Washington National Opera with performers including Luciano Pavarotti, Plácido Domingo, and Renee Fleming. She performed solo for King Hussein, Oscar Arias of Costa Rica, Deng Xiaoping, and at White House events for presidents Ronald Reagan and George H. W. Bush. She presented a one-woman show of Sondheim at The Kennedy Center and performed at the Wolf Trap Opera. Her composition "a L'infini" was featured on the Bravo Network finale of Project Runway season 1.

In 2021, Reagan performed the role of the Cantor in the Canterbury Voices' world premiere performance of Perpetual Solace, composed by Edward Knight and librettist M.J. Alexander. The production, which honored people of Oklahoma City affected by the 1995 Oklahoma City bombing, won the 2022 American Prize in Choral Performance. Reagan's world music/chant album Shunia earned the Silver Award in World Fusion Music at the 2021 COVR Visionary Awards.

== Academic career and teaching ==
Reagan was a professor of voice at the Shenandoah Conservatory of Music from 1998 to 2008. She was subsequently a professor of voice at the Wanda L. Bass School of Music at Oklahoma City University. In 2013, she was invited to perform at the Salzburg Music Festival in Austria, and while there, she conducted classes in opera performing and teaching again in 2018. In May 2022, she taught a masterclass in acting for opera singers at Accademia dell'Arte in Arezzo, Italy, which she reprised in 2023.

== Personal life ==
Reagan and her husband, Greg Love, live in Oklahoma City, Oklahoma and Aspen, Colorado.

== Discography ==
=== As Lisa Reagan ===
- Satori, 2002
- Arcana, 2006
- a L'Infini 2007 EP
- Noel, 2012
- Realm of Dreams, 2015
- Force of Love, 2016
- The Most Wonderful Time, 2016
- If Thoughts Could Tell, 2018
- What We Need Is Here, 2023

=== As Shunia ===
- Ascend, 2017
- Shunia, 2021

=== Additional recording credits ===
- Magic Music Myth, 2000 (Alchemy)
- Rising, 2004 (Margot MacDonald)
- Torn, 2007 (Marot MacDonald)
- Omspun, 2008 (Kgroovenada)
