= Scalia/Ginsburg =

2015 comic opera by Derrick Wang

Scalia/Ginsburg: A (Gentle) Parody of Operatic Proportions
- Comic opera by Derrick Wang
- Librettist: Derrick Wang
- Language: English
- Premiere: 11 July 2015; Castleton Festival

Scalia/Ginsburg is a 2015 comic opera (revised in 2017) by composer-librettist Derrick Wang about the relationship between United States Supreme Court Justices Antonin Scalia and Ruth Bader Ginsburg. Called "a dream come true" by Justice Ginsburg, the opera has been broadcast nationally on the radio in the United States, produced in the United States and internationally, and featured on Live with Carnegie Hall.

== Background ==
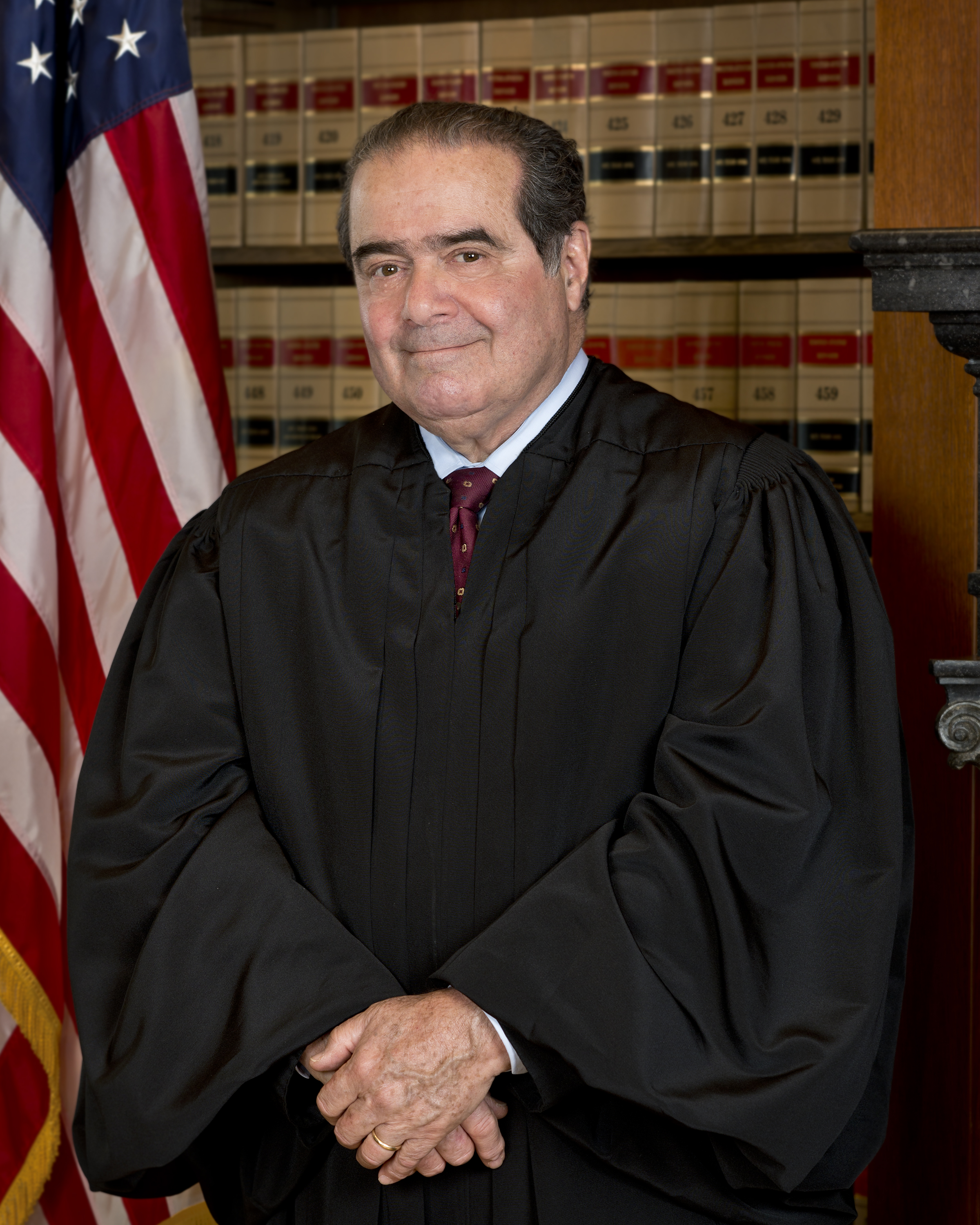
Antonin Scalia

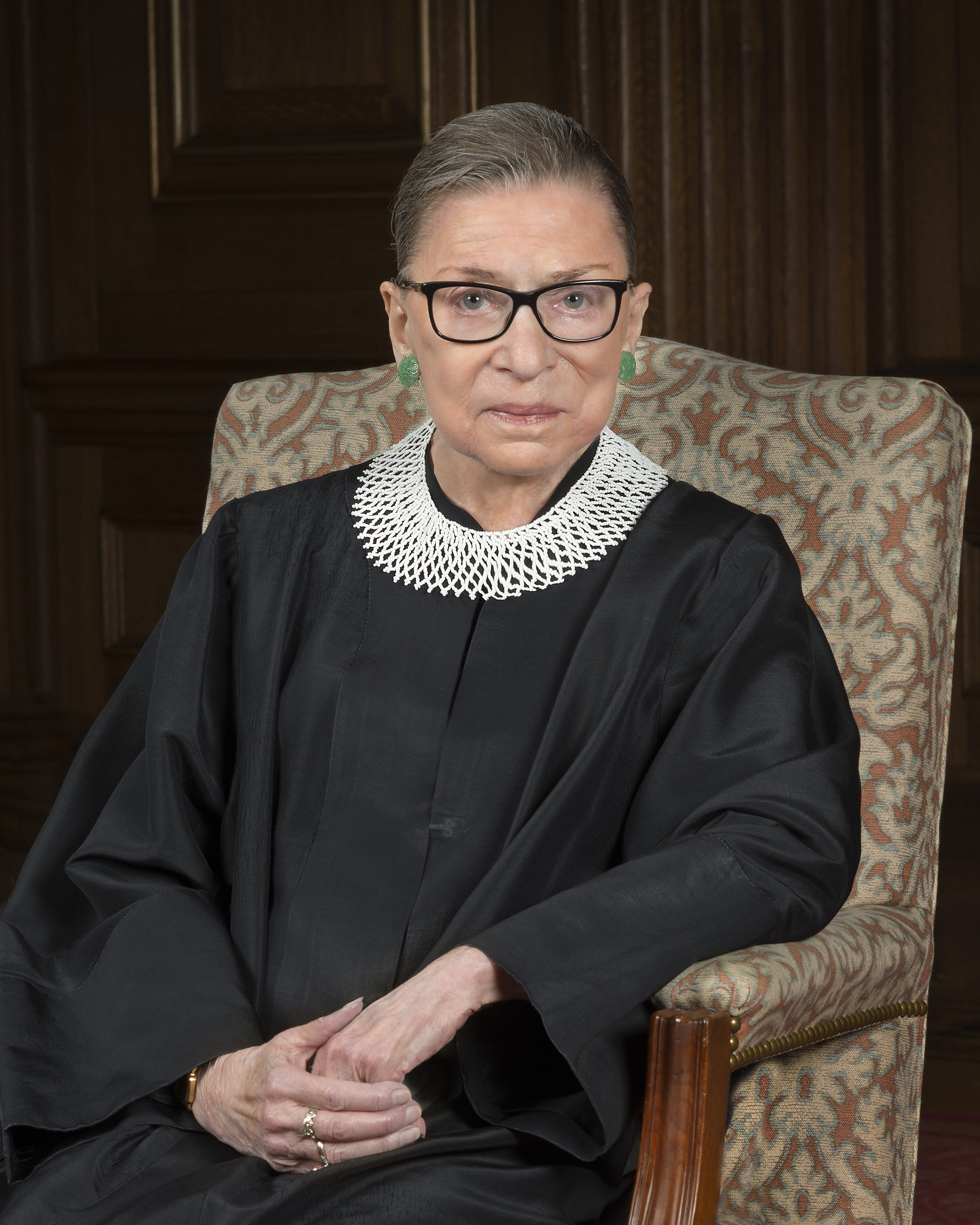
Ruth Bader Ginsburg

The comic opera is about the relationship between Supreme Court of the United States Justices Antonin Scalia and Ruth Bader Ginsburg. The work balances the personalities of the two justices, Scalia's bombastic temperament versus Ginsburg's more demure nature, reflects their public disagreements versus their private friendship, and highlights their shared love of opera. The two justices often dined and attended the opera together, and performed as supernumeraries in a 1994 Washington National Opera production of Ariadne auf Naxos.

=== Composition history ===
Wang, a composer and dramatist with music degrees from Harvard (A.B.) and Yale (M.M.), was a law student at the University of Maryland when he started writing the opera. Inspired by Ginsburg and Scalia's differing opinions, close friendship, and mutual passion for opera, he decided to dramatize their relationship in operatic form. In 2013, he presented excerpts before Ginsburg and Scalia at the Supreme Court.

=== Title ===
When asked why Scalia's name appeared first in the title Scalia/Ginsburg, Ginsburg explained not only that it "sounds better" but also that everything at the Court is done by seniority.

== Style ==
Wang described the opera's underlying concept as "operatic precedent," by which the words and music consistently cite legal and operatic sources in the manner of a court opinion. For example, Scalia enters singing a rage aria, whose 18th-century traditions reflect Scalia's originalism, but Ginsburg's first song evolves from opera to jazz to gospel and pop to reflect her philosophy of the evolving Constitution. Wang's narrative mixes constitutional theory (originalism versus living constitutionalism) with important decisions of the U.S. Supreme Court, and includes references to McCulloch v. Maryland (1819), Morrison v. Olson (1988), and Bush v. Gore (2000). The music mixes the compositional styles of Handel, Mozart, Rossini, and Bellini with "Verdi, Puccini, Christmas carols, 'The Star-Spangled Banner', and jazz."

== Performance history ==
The opera premiered at the Castleton Festival in Virginia on July 11, 2015, with Ginsburg attending; the opera had two more performances there. A revised version premiered at the Glimmerglass Festival in New York on August 4, 2017, with tenor William Burden in the role of Scalia and mezzo-soprano Mary Beth Nelson as Ginsburg; Justice Ginsburg attended the final performance. During the 2018 U.S. midterm election season, Opera North produced Scalia/Ginsburg in venues including Saint Anselm College. Additional productions include those by Opera Delaware, Opera Naples, Opera Carolina, Opera Grand Rapids, Opera Memphis, Chautauqua Opera, and the Princeton Symphony Orchestra’s Princeton Festival, in venues ranging from the Clinton Presidential Center to the Holocaust Museum Houston.

The 2019 Opera Delaware production, with soprano Jennifer Zetlan in the role of Ginsburg, was broadcast on radio in the United States and streamable internationally on November 7, 2020, on the WFMT Radio Network. In November 2020, Scalia/Ginsburg was featured on Live with Carnegie Hall, introduced by Metropolitan Opera star Isabel Leonard. In 2021, Scalia/Ginsburg received its Australian premiere by Orchestra Victoria at the Royal Botanic Gardens Victoria in collaboration with the Wheeler Centre, conducted by Australian Ballet chief conductor Nicolette Fraillon.

== Publication history ==
In 2015, The Columbia Journal of Law & the Arts published an early version of the libretto containing over 200 footnotes to legal and musical sources. Both justices wrote forewords to the libretto. One chapter of Ginsburg's 2016 book My Own Words consists of excerpts from the libretto, narrated and performed by Wang in the audiobook. Ginsburg quoted the opera in her statement on Scalia's death and cited it in her foreword to the book Scalia Speaks. In 2022, Justice Ginsburg's copy of the Scalia/Ginsburg libretto with a one-page autograph manuscript of her handwritten notes was sold at auction for over USD$10,000.

== In popular culture ==
On The Drew Barrymore Show, Drew Barrymore said of Scalia/Ginsburg, “When I read the words to this [opera], I had an incredible revelation…and it gave me so much hope.”

In an interview with the U.S. Copyright Office, filmmakers Betsy West and Julie Cohen credited Scalia/Ginsburg as an influence on their documentary RBG.

== Roles and their creators ==
- Ellen Wieser (soprano) as Justice Ruth Bader Ginsburg
- John Overholt (tenor) as Justice Antonin Scalia
- Adam Cioffari (bass-baritone) as the Commentator

Role	Voice type	World premiere cast Castleton, July 11, 2015 Conductor: Salvatore Percacciolo Director: Maria Tucci	Revised version Glimmerglass, August 4, 2017 Conductor: Jesse Leong Director: Brenna Corner	Radio broadcast Opera Delaware, November 7, 2020 Conductor: Sara Jobin Director: Fenlon Lamb
Justice Ruth Bader Ginsburg	soprano or mezzo-soprano	Ellen Wieser	Mary Beth Nelson	Jennifer Zetlan
Justice Antonin Scalia	tenor	John Overholt	William Burden	Brian Cheney
The Commentator	bass-baritone	Adam Cioffari	Brent Michael Smith	Ben Wager

== Synopsis ==
The opera starts in the Supreme Court Building with Scalia confronted in the courtroom by the "Commentator". The Commentator has supernatural powers and seals the room, stating "No man shall enter." Once the room is sealed, Scalia is forced to defend his approach to the law and may only escape by passing three trials. Ginsburg, not a man, breaks into the courtroom to defend her friend Scalia and insists on taking the trials alongside him. The opera ends after the two undergo the trials together.
