= Derrick Wang =

American composer and writer

- Education: Harvard University (BA); Yale University (MM)
- Occupations: Composer; writer
- Notable credit: Scalia/Ginsburg
- Website: https://www.derrickwang.com

Derrick Wang is an American composer and writer.

== Education ==
Wang graduated magna cum laude and Phi Beta Kappa from Harvard College, Harvard University, where he composed works including two musicals for the Hasty Pudding Theatricals. He received a master's degree from the Yale School of Music, and a J.D. from the University of Maryland Carey School of Law.

== Works ==
Wang came to international attention as the composer and librettist of Scalia/Ginsburg, the opera about United States Supreme Court Justices Antonin Scalia and Ruth Bader Ginsburg. Both justices wrote forewords to Wang's libretto. One chapter of Ginsburg's 2016 book My Own Words consists of excerpts from the libretto, narrated and performed by Wang in the audiobook. In 2022, Justice Ginsburg's copy of the Scalia/Ginsburg libretto with a one-page autograph manuscript of her handwritten notes was sold at auction for over US$10,000.

In 2024, Opera Delaware premiered Wang's new completion of the opera Turandot, praised as "adept," "respectful," and "seamless."

Wang's musical drama Fearless, inspired by the life of Women Airforce Service Pilot Hazel Ying Lee, receives its world premiere at Opera Delaware in 2025.

Wang, a musical dramatist and forensic musicologist, teaches music and law at Johns Hopkins University.
