= Inez Silberg =

American singer and voice teacher (1908–1985)

Inez Silberg, also known by her maiden name Inez Lunsford and as Inez Lunsford Silberg, (20 April 1908 - 24 April 1985) was an American voice teacher and soprano. The Oklahoman described her as an "internationally recognized voice coach and longtime Oklahoma City University voice professor". She was inducted into the Oklahoma Hall of Fame in 1977. Many of her students had successful singing careers.

== Life and career ==
Inez Scott Lunsford was born on 20 April 1908 in Paris, Texas. She was educated at the Kansas City Conservatory of Music (KCCM; now part of the University of Missouri–Kansas City) where she studied singing with tenor Harold Van Duzee. Van Duzee had studied singing with Jean de Reszke in Paris and in New York City with Oscar Seagle before having a career on the New York stage. He was director of the KCCM at the time of his death in 1940. Inez earned both a Bachelor and Master of Music degrees from the KCCM. After graduating from college she had an international career as a soprano in operas and in concerts with orchestras. In 1943 she married insurance agent Max Silberg.

In 1945 Silberg joined the voice faculty of Oklahoma City University. She taught at the university for many year; fifteen years of which were spent as the head of voice department at OCU. Some of her successful pupils included sopranos Leona Mitchell and Marquita Lister; mezzo-sopranos Gwendolyn Jones and Sheila Smith; baritone Stephen Dickson and Ron Raines; and tenors Chris Merritt, Neal Neace, and Carroll Freeman; many of whom were principal singers at the Metropolitan Opera. Soprano Leona Mitchell credited Silberg for assisting her in winning more than 30 vocal competitions while she was an OCU student.

Silberg was also the singing teacher of Florence Birdwell who became a famous voice teacher in her own right. Birdwell's pupils included Kristin Chenoweth, Kelli O'Hara and Susan Powell.

Inez Silberg died on 24 April 1985 in Oklahoma City at the age of 77.
