= Gwendolyn Jones =

American operatic mezzo-soprano

Gwendolyn Jones is an American operatic mezzo-soprano who has had an active career in concerts and operas since the late 1960s. From 1972–1980 she was a resident artist with the San Francisco Opera, and was afterwards a regular performer with the New York City Opera and New Orleans Opera.

== Life and career ==
Born in Oklahoma, Jones studied singing with Inez Lunsford Silberg at Oklahoma City University. In 1968 she won the Metropolitan Opera National Council Auditions at the age of 19. In 1972 she made her debut at the San Francisco Opera (SFO) as Wellgunde in Das Rheingold. She appeared regularly at the SFO over the next eight years, portraying such roles as Albine in Thaïs, Alisa in Lucia di Lammermoor, Anna in L'Africaine, the Charwoman in The Makropulos Affair, Clotilde in Norma, Countess Ceprano in Rigoletto, Curra in La forza del destino, Dryade in Ariadne auf Naxos, Emilia in Otello, Flora in La traviata, Flosshilde in Das Rheingold, Fyodor in Boris Godunov, Geneviève in Pelléas et Mélisande, Glasha in Káťa Kabanová, Isaura in Tancredi, Kate Pinkerton in Madama Butterfly, Laura in Luisa Miller, Mirinda in Ormindo, the Second Lady in The Magic Flute, Sextus in Giulio Cesare, Siebel in Faust, Siegrune in Die Walküre, the Voice From Above in Die Frau ohne Schatten, and Wowkle in La fanciulla del West among others. Her final appearance at the SFO was in 1980 as Rychtarka in Jenůfa.

In 1973 Jones sang the role of Wellgunde in Götterdämmerung with the Chicago Symphony Orchestra under Georg Solti at Carnegie Hall. In 1976 she portrayed Tisbe in La Cenerentola at the Seattle Opera. In 1978 she sang several songs by Gustav Mahler in concert with the San Francisco Ballet at the Brooklyn Academy of Music. In 1981 she portrayed the title heroine in Rossini's La Cenerentola at the Virginia Opera. In 1982 she portrayed Nerillo in Ormindo with the Chamber Opera Theater of New York. In 1984 she sang Hedwige in William Tell with the Opera Orchestra of New York. That same year she performed Nerillo again for her debut at the Festival dei Due Mondi in Spoleto, Italy. In 1985 she made her debut with the Pennsylvania Opera Theater as Isabella in L'italiana in Algeri at the Walnut Street Theatre.

In 1988 Jones made her debut at the New York City Opera as Cherubino in The Marriage of Figaro; a part she repeated with the NYCO in 1993 and 1995. In 1994 she appeared as Venus in Tannhäuser at the New Orleans Opera. In 1996 she portrayed Octavian in the NYCO's production of Der Rosenkavalier. In 2000 and 2004 she appeared as Marcellina in The Marriage of Figaro at the NYCO. In 2001 she portrayed the role of Alma March in the Houston Grand Opera's production of Mark Adamo's Little Women which was broadcast on PBS's Great Performances. She reprised the role of Alma March at the Central City Opera (CCO) in 2001, Opera Pacific in 2001, Opera Omaha in 2002, the NYCO in 2003, Opera Delaware in 2008, and the Pensacola Opera in 2011. She was also seen at the CCO in 2001 as Queen Elizabeth I in Britten's Gloriana.

In 2001 Jones appeared at the New Orleans Opera (NOO) as the Composer in Ariadne auf Naxos. She has returned to the NOO several times since, including performances of Marcellina (2006), Berta in The Barber of Seville (2006), La Ciesca in Gianni Schicchi (2007), Mary in The Flying Dutchman (2010), Herodias in Salome (2012), and Suse Blunt in Heinrich Marschner's Der Vampyr (2013). In 2002 she portrayed the title role in Bizet's Carmen at the Nevada Opera, and later returned to that company in 2007 as Amneris in Aida. In 2004 she appeared as the Mother in Hansel and Gretel at the Utah Opera. In 2005 she portrayed Augusta Tabor in The Ballad of Baby Doe at the Des Moines Metro Opera. She returned to Des Moines in 2008 to portray the title role in Blitzstein's Regina.
