= Jennifer Zetlan =

American operatic soprano

Jennifer Zetlan (b. February 21, 1984) is an American operatic soprano who has sung leading roles with many opera companies in the United States, including the Metropolitan Opera, the Seattle Opera, and the Santa Fe Opera among others. She has performed in the world premieres of operas by composers Matthew Aucoin, Daron Hagen, Nico Muhly, and Ricky Ian Gordon.

== Life and career ==
Born in Wilmington, Delaware, Zetlan studied at New York University's Tisch School of the Arts, Mannes College The New School for Music and the Juilliard School. In 2004 she portrayed Euridice in Orpheus in the Underworld at the Opera in the Ozarks at Inspiration Point. In 2007 she made her debut at the Metropolitan Opera as one of the French actresses in Sergei Prokofiev's War and Peace. That same year she made her debuts at the Florida Grand Opera (as Lisa in Vincenzo Bellini's La Sonnambula) and the New York City Opera (as Frasquita in Georges Bizet's Carmen).

In 2009 Zetlan made her debut with the Nashville Opera as Madeline Usher in Philip Glass's The Fall of the House of Usher. In May 2010 she created the role of The Flier in the world premiere of Daron Hagen's Amelia at the Seattle Opera. She has since returned to Seattle as Musetta in La boheme (2012), the Forest Bird in Siegfried (2013), Gilda in Rigoletto (2014), and Woglinde in both Das Rheingold (2013) and Gotterdammerung (2013).

Zetlan returned to the Met in October 2010 to portray Xenia in Modest Mussorgsky's Boris Godunov with René Pape in the title role. In 2011 she made her debut at the Santa Fe Opera as Sardula in Gian Carlo Menotti's The Last Savage. That same year she portrayed Zina in the world premiere of Nico Muhly's Dark Sisters with the Gotham Chamber Opera; later reprising that role with Opera Philadelphia in 2012. In 2012 she was the soprano soloist in Mozart's Mass in C minor with the New York Philharmonic at Avery Fisher Hall. In 2013 she portrayed Rebecca in Muhly's Two Boys at the Met; a role which she also recorded on disc under the baton of David Robertson for Nonesuch Records. That same year she made her debut at the Nashville Opera as Pamina in The Magic Flute.

In 2015 Zetlan created roles in two world premieres: Fanny in Ricky Ian Gordon's Morning Star at the Cincinnati Opera and the Messenger in Matthew Aucoin's Crossing with the American Repertory Theater. Also in 2015, she performed the role of Despina in Così fan tutte with the Milwaukee Symphony Orchestra. In 2019 and 2020, Zetlan starred as Ruth Bader Ginsburg in Derrick Wang’s Scalia/Ginsburg at Opera Delaware, Opera Carolina, and Opera Grand Rapids.
