= OBVI =

OBVI may refer to:

- OBVI - Office for the Blind and Visually Impaired, Wisconsin Department of Health Services
- OBVI, Opera Breve Vocal Intensive Carroll Freeman
- OBVI files, from Obvious Technology, Object-Based Video Interface circa 1999
