= Sergio Monteiro =

Brazilian musician

Sergio Monteiro (12 February 1974) is a Brazilian pianist.

He began studying the piano at the age of 4 and went on to work under the guidance of Myrian Dauelsberg at the National Music School of Rio de Janeiro, where he completed the bachelor's and master's degree. In 2000, he was awarded a scholarship by the Ministry of Culture to study at the Eastman School of Music in the U.S., where he worked on his Doctor of Musical Arts under Nelita True. In 2003, he won first Prize at the Martha Argerich International Piano competition in Buenos Aires and was invited to play with the Buenos Aires Philharmonic conducted by Charles Dutoit at the Colon Theatre, which launched his international career. Following the competition, he was selected as one of the five pianists to participate at the International Academy of Piano, in lake Como, Italy, where he had the chance to work closely with teachers such as Claude Frank, Fou Ts'ong and Andreas Staier. During the years in Europe, he played at the Philarmonie and the Konzerthaus, in Berlin, Sala Palestrina, in Rome, Sibelius Academy, in Finland, at the Kremlin, etc. In the Fall of 2009 he was appointed Head of the Piano Department at the Wanda L. Bass School of Music, Oklahoma City University, U.S., an All-Steinway School.

An champion of Brazilian music, Sergio Monteiro has been honored by many composers with invitations to give premieres of original compositions dedicated to him.

Said pianist Martha Argerich, "Sergio Monteiro is an artist with extraordinary creativity and energy. When he starts playing, music comes to life. His love for music is very strong and passionate and music loves him in return. His pianism is brilliant, extremely generous, inspired and particularly interesting. I strongly recommend him and I am looking forward to hearing him play again and again. It is pure joy and very stimulating".
