= William Burden (tenor) =

American opera singer

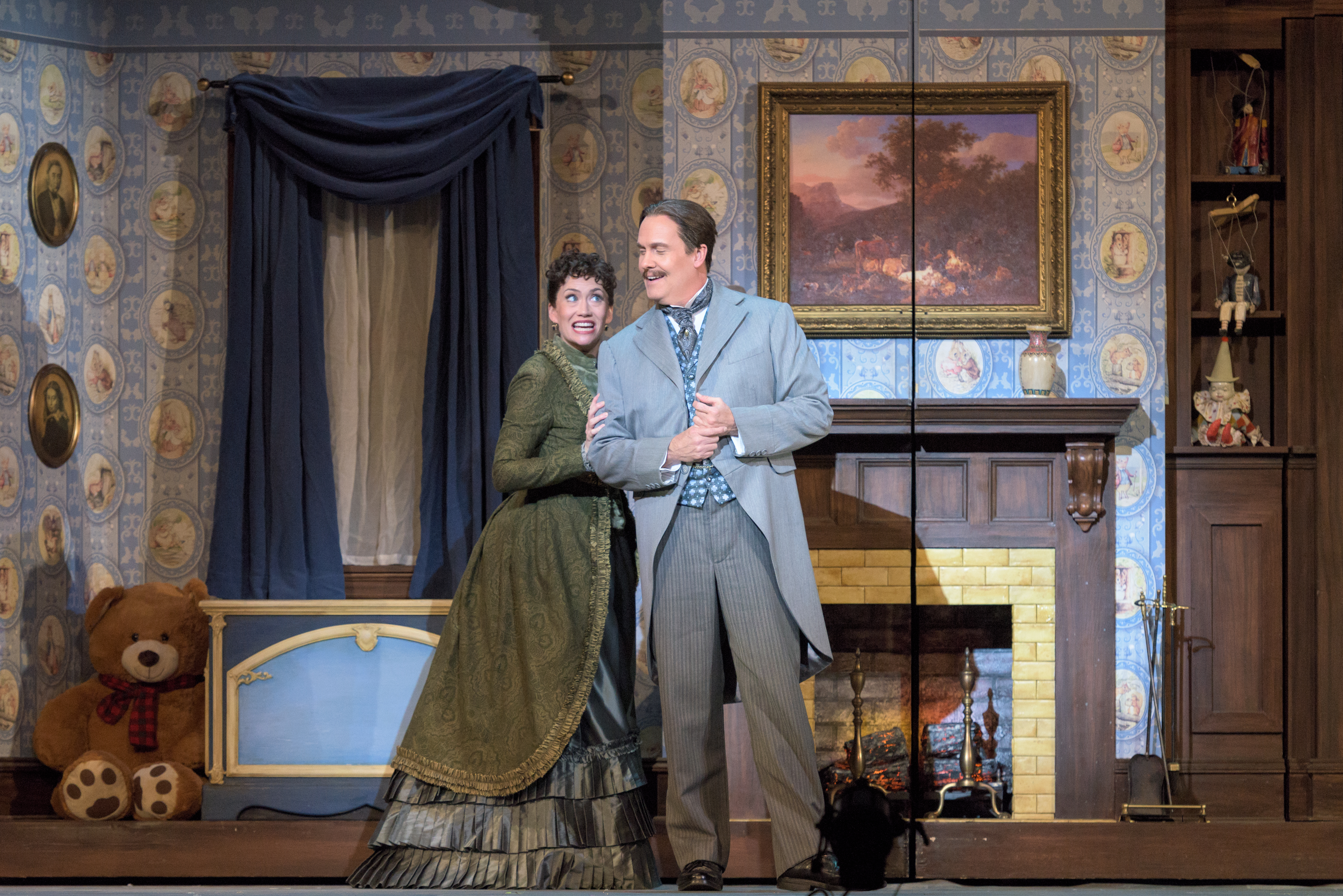
William Burden as Frank Harris in Oscar at Opera Philadelphia, 2015, with Heidi Stober as Ada Leverson.

William Burden is an American opera singer (tenor). Since his professional debut at the San Francisco Opera in 1992, he had performed in lead roles in North America and Europe.

== Education ==
William Burden was born in Miami, Florida. As an undergraduate he studied at Middlebury College and then entered the Indiana University School of Music where he received his master's degree in Vocal Performance working with Margaret Harshaw. Burden participated in a number of summer programs, the Merola Program of the San Francisco Opera, the Santa Fe Opera Apprentice program, and the Wolf Trap Young Artists’ Program.

== Professional career ==
In 1992 Burden was called to the San Francisco Opera to sing Count Lerma in Don Carlo and Janek in The Makropoulos Case. He has appeared in lead roles at major opera houses, including Metropolitan Opera, San Francisco Opera, Lyric Opera of Chicago, Houston Grand Opera, Seattle Opera, Opera Philadelphia, Santa Fe Opera, New York City Opera, La Scala, Glyndebourne Opera Festival, Paris Opera, Munich State Opera, Canadian Opera Company, and the Saito Kinen Festival.

Burden has performed in a number of world premieres: Gilbert Griffiths in Tobias Picker's An American Tragedy (Metropolitan Opera, 2005), Dodge in Daron Hagen's Amelia (Seattle Opera, 2010), Nikolaus Sprink in Kevin Puts's Silent Night, Dan Hill in Christopher Theofanidis's Heart of a Soldier (San Francisco Opera, 2011), Peter in Mark Adamo's Gospel of Mary Magdalene (San Francisco Opera, 2013), Frank Harris in Theodore Morrison's Oscar (Santa Fe Opera, 2013), and Louis in the stage premiere of Kevin Puts's The Hours (Metropolitan Opera, 2022). His performance in The Hours was video-cast on December 10 as part of the Metropolitan Opera Live in HD series.

He performed the role of Antonin Scalia in the revised version of Derrick Wang’s Scalia/Ginsburg (Glimmerglass Festival, 2017). While singing the title role in Leonard Bernstein's Candide in 1992 at the Skylight Opera Theater in Milwaukee, he met his future wife, Carol Chickering, who was singing the role of Cunegonde. Bill and Carol went on to have two children, a daughter, Claire, and a son, Jaxon.

His repertoire includes many lead roles, including:

- Scalia, in Scalia/Ginsburg,
- Faust, in Faust,
- Peléas, in Pelléas et Mélisande,
- Orphée, in Orphée et Eurydice,
- Tom Rakewell, in The Rake’s Progress,
- Roméo, in Roméo et Juliette,
- Bénédict, in Béatrice et Bénédict
- Edgardo, in Lucia di Lammermoor,
- Aschenbach, in Death in Venice,
- Captain Vere, in Billy Budd,
- Don Jose in Carmen,
- Nikolaus Sprink, in Silent Night,
- Shepherd, in King Roger

Burden also sang in concert with Les Arts Florissants, the BBC Orchestra, and the Berlin Philharmonic, among others. He is currently a faculty member at Mannes School of Music, where he serves as Chair of the Voice Department, and The Juilliard School. Burden has also studied with Arthur Levy.

== Comments ==
Anthony Tommasini wrote about one of his performances that his “(s)ubdued emotional intensity permeates every line of his singing. His English diction is a model of clarity”.
