= Stephen Dickson =

American baritone (1951–1991)

Stephen Dickson (16 February 1951 – 18 October 1991) was an American baritone who had an active career in operas and concerts from 1972 through 1990. He was active with the United States's most important opera companies during the 1980s, sharing the stage with many notable singers like Luciano Pavarotti, Jessye Norman, and Renata Scotto. He was particularly admired for his portrayal of Papageno in The Magic Flute, a role he sang throughout Europe and the United States. At the time of his premature death, Dickson had just reached the pinnacle of his career, having only recently gained a more substantial role at the Metropolitan Opera in New York City and with major European opera houses like the Royal Opera, London and the Bavarian State Opera among others.

== Education ==
Born in Oklahoma City, Dickson graduated from Putnam City High School in 1969. He then studied with Inez Lunsford Silberg at Oklahoma City University (OCU) where he graduated in 1973. He then pursued further studies with Gregory Stapp in San Francisco. He later returned to OCU in 1990 for one year to fill in as a voice instructor for Florence Birdwell, who was on sabbatical.

== Career ==
Dickson made his professional opera debut at the Santa Fe Opera (SFO) in 1972 in the minor role of one of the guests in the United States premiere of Aribert Reimann's Melusine. He appeared in small to mid-sized parts with a number of smaller American companies during the 1970s. His first leading role came in 1977 at the Houston Grand Opera when he portrayed Figaro in Gioachino Rossini's The Barber of Seville. That same year he returned to the SFO to portray Guglielmo in Così fan tutte and Emilio in the American premiere of Nino Rota's Il cappello di paglia di Firenze. He returned to Santa Fe periodically through 1984, appearing in such roles as Papageno in The Magic Flute and Prince Paul in La Grande-Duchesse de Gérolstein. He also notably directed the SFO's 1980 production of Eugene Onegin.

In 1978, Dickson sang in an internationally televised production of Albert Herring from the Opera Theatre of St. Louis. In 1980 he made his first appearance with the New York City Opera as Ford in Die lustigen Weiber von Windsor under conductor Julius Rudel. With that company, he went on to appear in Ariadne auf Naxos (as Harlekin), La bohème (as Schaunard), Les pêcheurs de perles, Pagliacci, and Faust. In 1987, he sang Papageno in the NYCO's nationally televised production of The Magic Flute with Jon Garrison as Tamino.

In the early 1980s, Dickson's career began to take off with a series of important engagements with America's top opera companies. He made his debut at the Metropolitan Opera on November 24, 1981, as Papageno to the Pamina of Gail Robinson, Tamino of David Kuebler, and Queen of the Night of Zdzisława Donat. He later returned to the Met to sing Harlekin in Ariadne auf Naxos annually from 1985 to 1988 with casts that notably included Jessye Norman as Ariadne, Kathleen Battle as Zerbinetta, and James King as Bacchus. His final performance of the series on March 12, 1988, which was to be his last appearance at the Met, was televised (and later released on DVD).

Dickson made his first appearance at the Lyric Opera of Chicago on May 14, 1982, as Dr Falke in Johann Strauss II's Die Fledermaus with Gualtiero Negrini as Alfred. He returned there the following September to portray Frédéric in Léo Delibes's Lakmé with Luciana Serra in the title role. On November 4, 1982 Dickson made his debut at the San Francisco Opera as Prince Yeletsky in The Queen of Spades with Teresa Żylis Gara is Lisa and Regina Resnik as the Countess. He returned to San Francisco frequently over the next six years, singing such roles as Albert in Werther (with Alfredo Kraus in the title role and Renata Scotto as Charlotte), Mercutio in Roméo et Juliette (with Ruth Ann Swenson as Juliette), and Guglielmo (with Dénes Gulyás as Ferrando, Etelka Csavlek as Fiordiligi, and Diana Montague as Dorabella). His final appearance with that company was as Schaunard to the Mimi of Mirella Freni and Rodolfo of Luciano Pavarotti on December 11, 1988. That production, directed by Francesca Zambello, was video taped and released on VHS and DVD.

On the international stage, Dickson made his European debut in 1979 as Papageno, a role he sang in numerous opera houses in Austria, Italy, France, and Germany during the 1980s. His European performance credits include appearances at the Bavarian State Opera, the Bayreuth Festival, the Paris Opera, and the Zurich Opera. His last European appearance was as Figaro in The Barber of Seville in 1988 for his debut at the Royal Opera, London.

In 1991, at the age of forty, Stephen Dickson died at his mother's home in Oklahoma City, of complications from AIDS.

== Honors ==
- On December 20, 1981, Dickson performed in a concert of Young American Artists at the White House, hosted by Beverly Sills.
- In 1987 Dickson was inducted into the Oklahoma City University Performance Hall of Honor.
- In 1988 Dickson performed the role of Figaro in Il barbiere di Siviglia in a special performance at the White House at the invitation of President Ronald Reagan.
- In 1989 Governor Henry Bellmon appointed Dickson an Ambassador of Oklahoma to the United States and the World, bestowing on him the title "Contributor to the State of Excellence".
- In 1990 Governor Bellmon and the Oklahoma Arts Council awarded Dickson the Oklahoma Cultural Ambassador Award.
- In 2008 an annual scholarship in his name was established at Oklahoma City University, by Ron Raines.
