= Marquita Lister =

American operatic soprano (born 1961)

Marquita Lister (born 24 April 1961) is an American operatic soprano. She has sung with major companies in the U.S. and abroad, specializing in the lirico-spinto repertoire. Lister is considered one of the leading interpreters of Bess in Porgy and Bess, having performed the role hundreds of times in companies across the globe, and is particularly known for her portrayals of Aida and Salome, which have become signature roles.

== Early life and education ==
Lister was born in Washington, D.C. She attended Western High School before it became the Duke Ellington School for the Performing Arts, and then she transferred to Woodrow Wilson High School from which she graduated. As a teenager, she won several vocal competitions, including the regional Metropolitan Opera Auditions in 1983. She went on to graduate from the New England Conservatory of Music with a Bachelor of Music degree and earned a Master of Music degree from Oklahoma City University, where she studied with famed vocal teacher Inez Silberg. In 1983 she won the regional Metropolitan Opera Auditions.

== Career ==
Lister apprenticed at the Houston Grand Opera (1987–89), and made her mainstage debut with the company as the title heroine in Giuseppe Verdi's Aida in 1992. She went on to sing principal soprano roles at the San Francisco Opera, Portland Opera, Austin Lyric Opera, and the Vancouver Opera among others. She played Bess in a world tour that included performances at the Opéra Bastille in Paris and the La Scala in Milan. She sang Musetta in La bohème at the Arena di Verona Festival, then Bess, yet again, at the Bregenzer Festspiele and New York City Opera, where she won the Diva Award (2002). She also appeared as Bess in New York City Opera's "Live From Lincoln Center" PBS broadcast of Porgy and Bess on March 20, 2002.

Lister has performed Lady Macbeth and Aida at Dresden's Semperoper, Rusalka at Boston Lyric Opera, and Cassandre in Les Troyens at the Amazon Theatre in Brazil. Last summer she again starred as Bess in a concert version of Gershwin's opera at the Hollywood Bowl.

She has performed with world-renowned artists such as Plácido Domingo, Justino Díaz, Frederica Von Stade, Simon Estes, and Sherrill Milnes. She has recorded George Gershwin's Blue Monday and excerpts from Porgy and Bess for Telarc Records with Erich Kunzel and the Cincinnati Pops; "Where the Sunsets Bleed: The Chamber Music of Edward Knight" for Albany Records; and the critically acclaimed Porgy and Bess for Decca, hailed by Opera News as one of the best recordings of 2006.

In April 2011, Lister reprised her signature role of Bess in a concert production with the Akron Symphony. During August 2011, Lister sang the role of Serena in Porgy and Bess at Tanglewood. Also that year, she performed a program of Gershwin classics with Maestro Tovey at the keyboard in Vancouver, Canada and appeared with him and the Vancouver Symphony Orchestra's Mahler extravaganza (MahlerPlus) in the composer's Symphony No. 2 in C minor, Resurrection to a standing ovation.

In February 2012, she joined the African American Art Song Alliance at the University of California, Irvine, where she sang the song cycle, "The Wider View" by H. Leslie Adams, as well as the Act II aria, “Lady of the Water,” from "Amistad" by Anthony Davis. The following month she appeared at the Videmus@Festival on the Hill at the University of North Carolina, Chapel Hill, where she gave a master class and performed a tribute concert honoring the distinguished Videmus organization.

Additionally, at the request of composer Michael Ching, Ms. Lister recorded his contribution to the Opera America Songbook commissioned to celebrate the opening of the National Opera Center. She then reprised the role of Serena in a concert performance of "Porgy and Bess" with the Boston Symphony Orchestra, again under the direction of Maestro Tovey.

Ms. Lister continues to appear on a variety of television programs. She recently launched a radio talk show series with noted radio host Doug Llewellyn, and appears regularly on WAMU radio.

== Personal ==
For many years Lister has served as the national spokesperson for the Negro "Spiritual" Scholarship Foundation Negro Spiritual Scholarship Foundation, which helps young singers obtain funds to pursue their musical education. In December 2011, Lister accepted the prestigious Victory Award from National Rehabilitation Hospital in Washington, D.C., where she underwent treatment for an illness several years ago. After receiving treatment at the National Rehabilitation Hospital, Lister recovered and returned to the stage.
