= Wanda L. Bass School of Music =

Music school at Oklahoma City University

Coordinates: 35°29′43″N 97°32′22″W

Oklahoma City University Bass School of Music
- Type: Private
- Established: 1940s 2006 (current school)
- Parent institution: Oklahoma City University
- Dean: Mark Parker
- Students: 350
- Location: Oklahoma City, Oklahoma, USA
- Campus: Urban
- Website: http://www.okcu.edu/music

The Wanda L Bass School of Music is a College at Oklahoma City University. It offers several degrees including; a BM, MM, and a BA in several areas of Music. The Bass School of Music at Oklahoma City University is an All-Steinway School, the nation’s first Conn-Selmer School, a member of the National Alliance for Music Theatre, and winner of ASCAP’s national orchestral award for adventurous programming of contemporary music.

== Degrees ==
The Bass School offers two undergraduate tracks. The performance-intensive Bachelor of Music degree and the Bachelor of Arts with a major in Music. Bachelor of Music in instrumental performance, music theater, vocal performance, music education, composition, music business, and piano pedagogy are all offered degrees. The Bass School graduate programs integrate performance skills and pedagogy. The Master's of Music degrees include composition, conducting, instrumental performance, opera performance, and music theater.

== Opera and Music Theater Company ==
In addition to providing degrees in various areas of music, the Wanda L Bass School of Music is known for its opera and musical theatre productions. The OKCU Opera and Music Theater Company has annually and consecutively put on seasons of operas and musicals since 1951, usually putting on six productions each season. In recent years the school has produced many shows including; Children of Eden, Spring Awakening, The Consul, Spamalot, Closer Than Ever, The Music Man, Parade, La Boheme, Seussical, The Secret Garden, The Music Man, Urban Cowboy, The Merry Wives of Windsor, A Streetcar Named Desire, The Magic Flute, The Pirates of Penzance, Guys and Dolls, Falstaff, Lucia di Lammermoor, Oil City Symphony, The Boor, Signor Deluso, The Medium, The Fantastiks, Man of La Mancha, Sweeney Todd, The Merry Widow, Suor Angelica, L'heure espagnole, Kiss Me, Kate, West Side Story, Passion, Susannah, Così fan tutte, The Elixir of Love, Bye Bye Birdie, The Tender Land, Working, The Impresario and Oklahoma. In 2022, the company put on a production of Mark Adamo's opera Little Women which was music directed by Alexander Mickelthwate, the current music director of Oklahoma City Philharmonic. The Wanda L. Bass School of Music produces another, student-run company called Stripped, where students will direct, cast and produce musicals that are "stripped down" to essentials with limited set design and costuming. OKCU Stripped usually performs smaller-scale musicals, such as The 25th Annual Putnam County Spelling Bee or Songs for a New World. Student works have also been premiered with OKCU Stripped

== Notable alumni ==
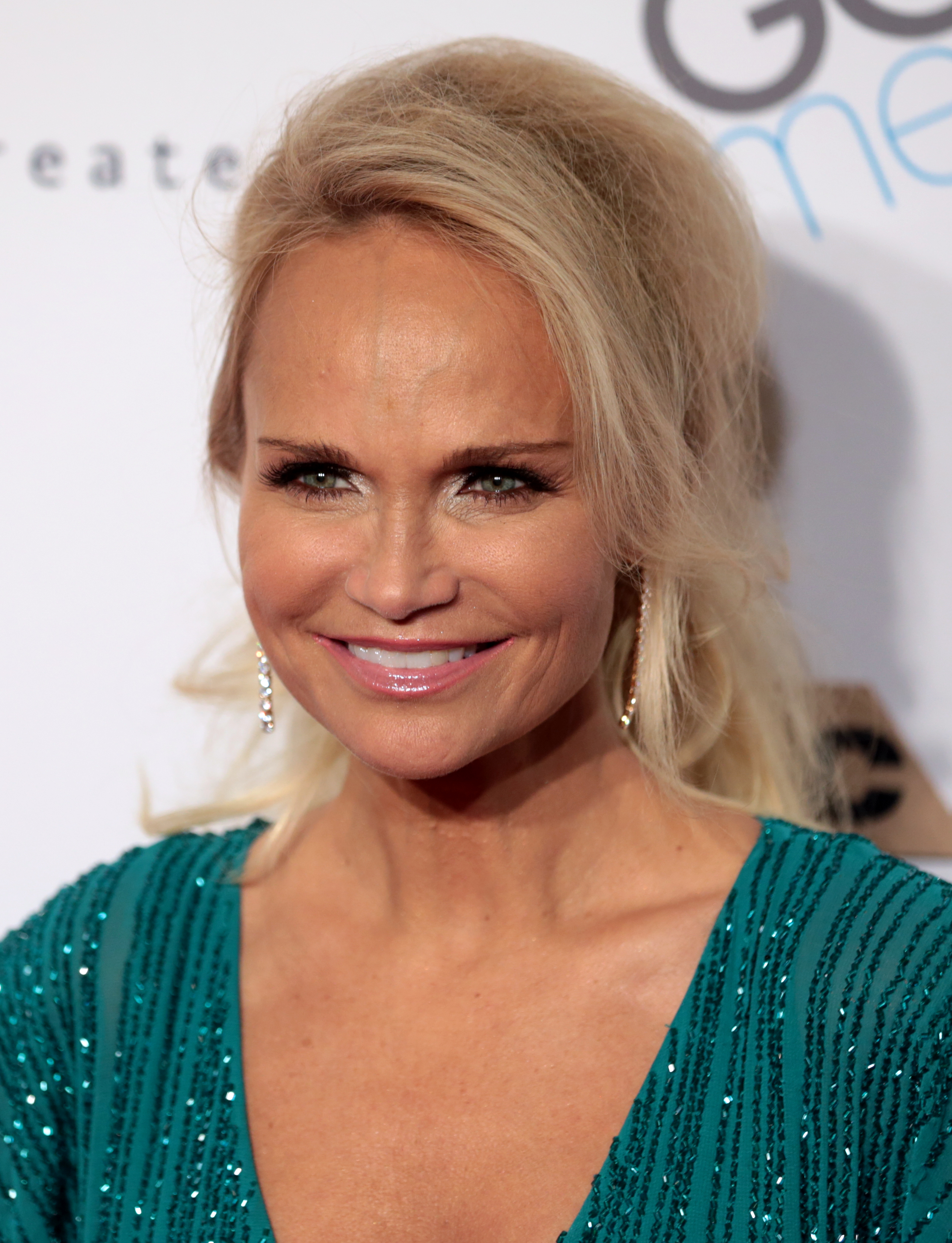
Kristin Chenoweth, Tony Award-winning actress in musical theatre, film and television

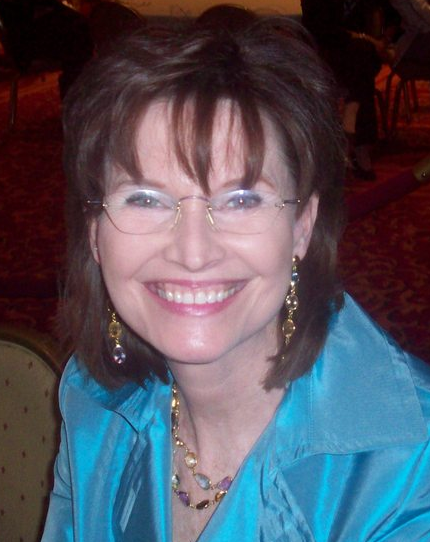
Jane Anne Jayroe, broadcaster, author, public official and Miss America 1967

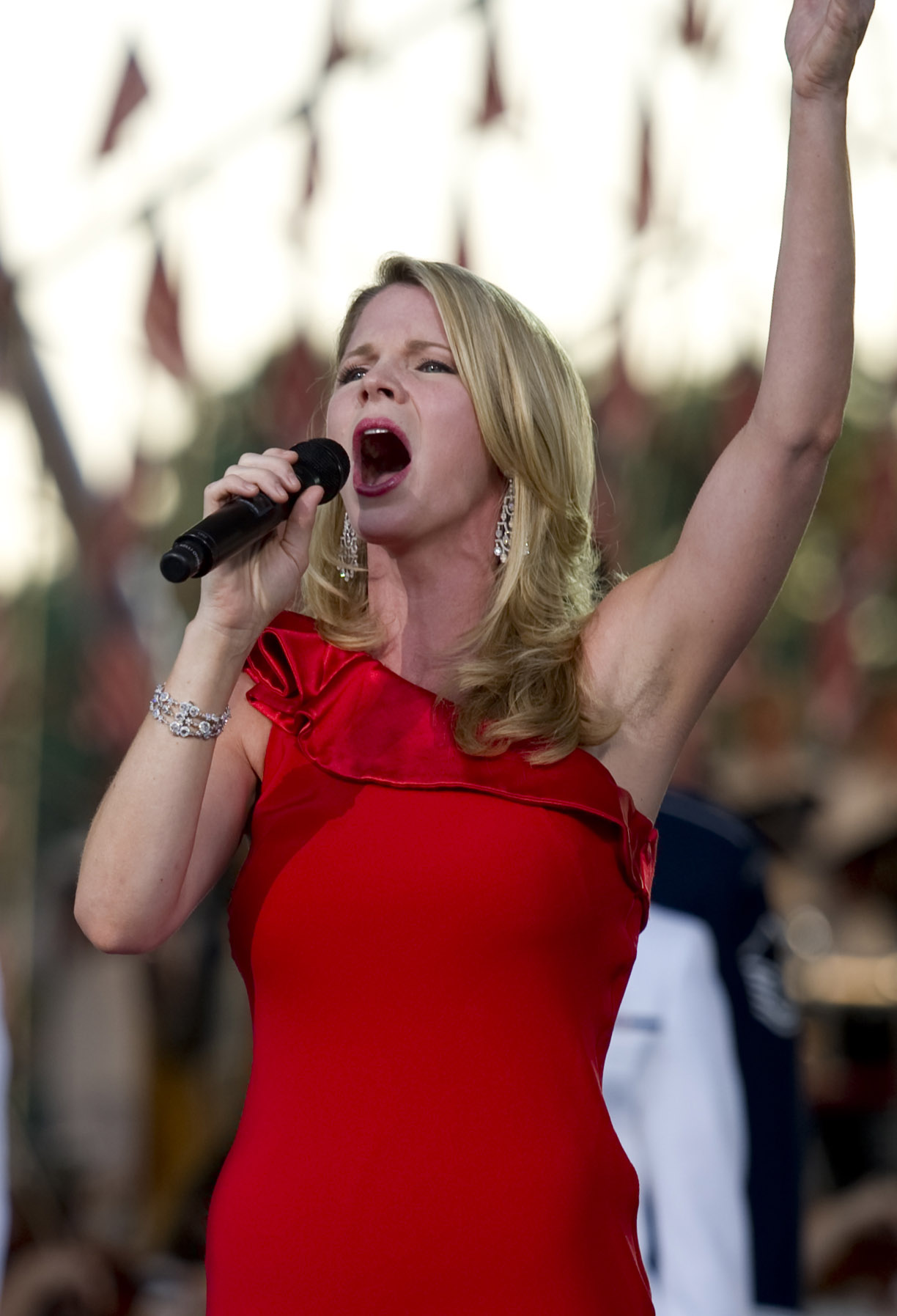
Kelli O'Hara, Tony Award-winning actress and singer most known for her work on the Broadway and opera stages

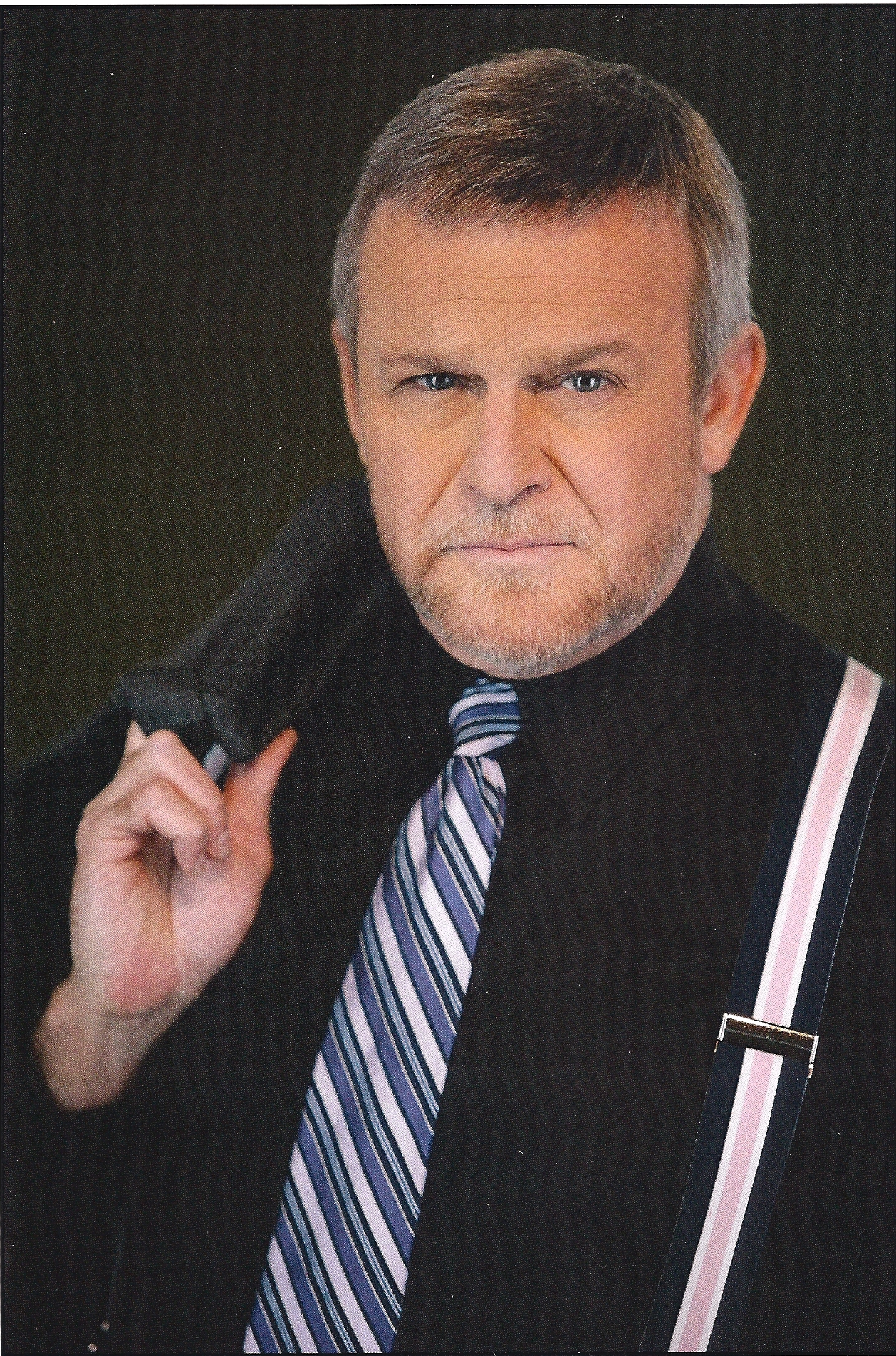
Ron Raines, actor on stage and screen known for the role of Alan Spaulding on the television soap opera Guiding Light

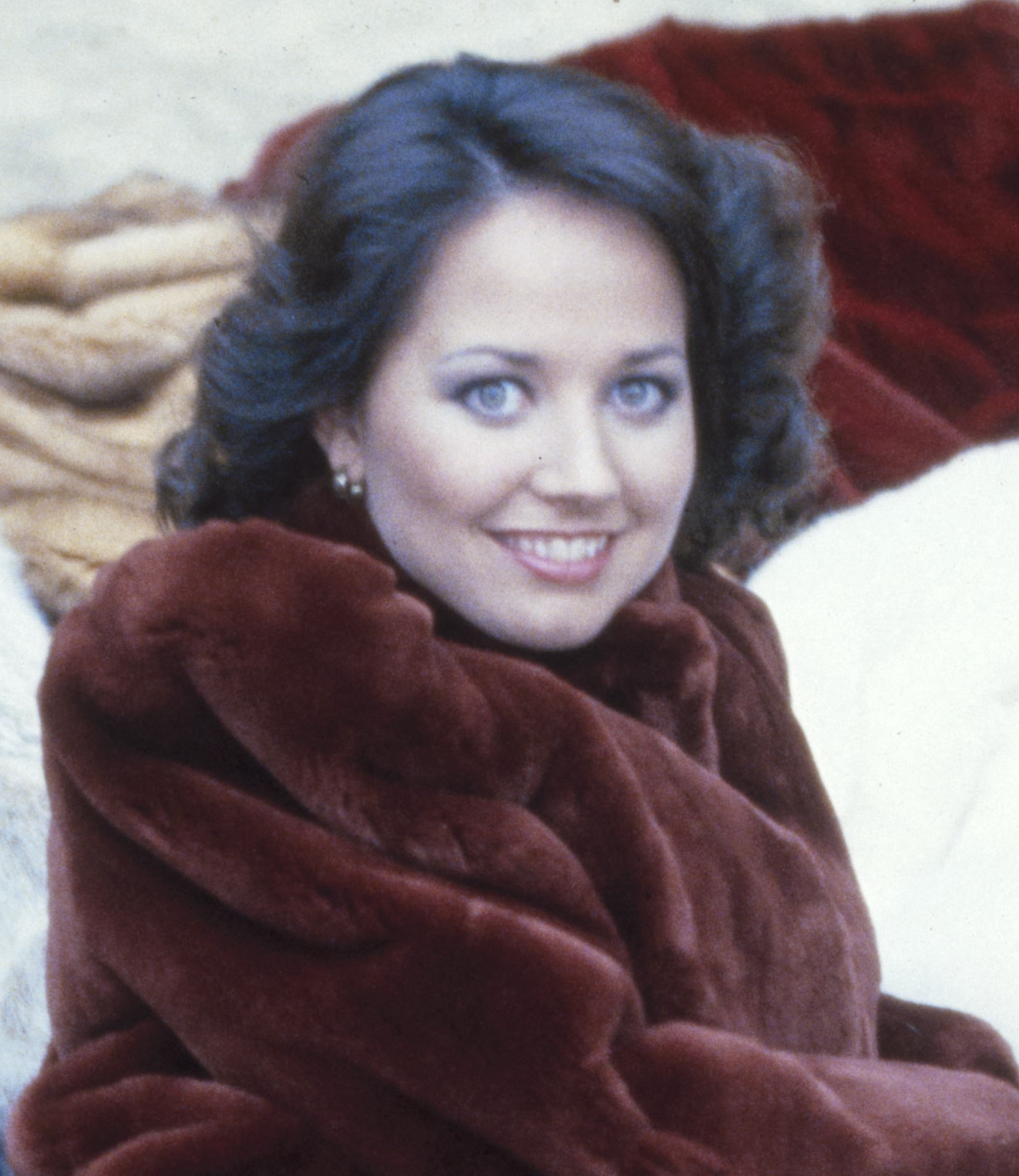
Susan Powell, actress, singer, and television personality who was Miss America 1981

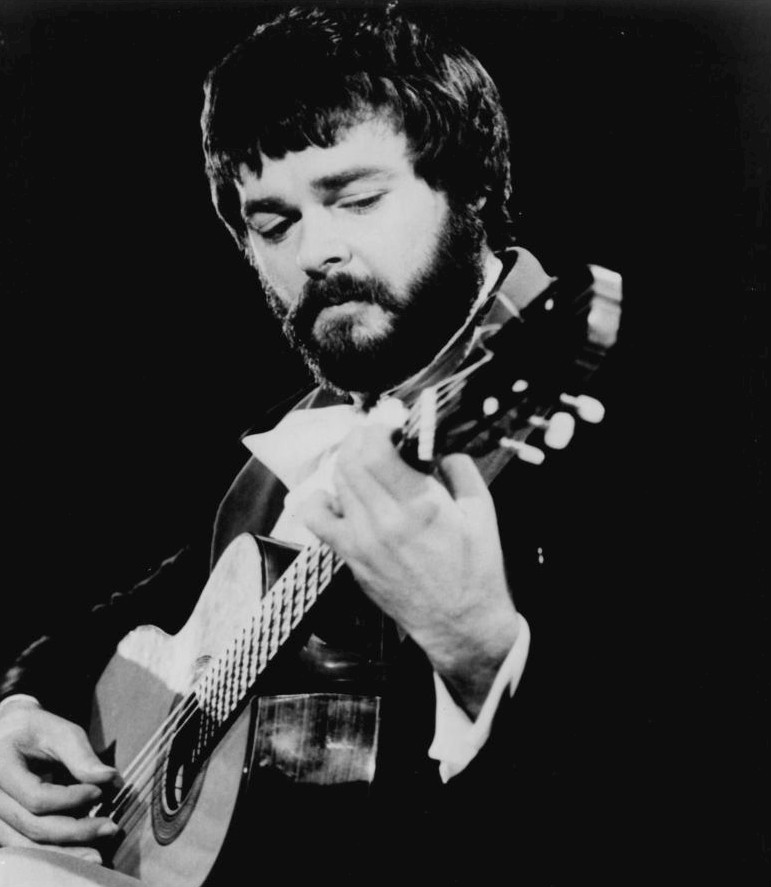
Mason Williams, classical guitarist, composer, singer, writer, comedian, and poet
- Florence Birdwell, educator, musician, and singer who ended up returning to the Wanda L. Bass School to become a world-renowned voice teacher
- Austin Brown, tenor and member of the country a cappella group Home Free
- Kristin Chenoweth, Tony Award-winning actress in musical theatre, film and television
- Sarah Coburn, operatic soprano
- Edgar Cruz, classical and fingerstyle guitarist
- Stephen Dickson, operatic baritone
- Jane Anne Jayroe, broadcaster, author, public official and Miss America 1967
- William Johns, operatic tenor
- Stacey Logan, Broadway actress known for roles in the original casts of Crazy for You and Beauty and the Beast
- Timothy Long, music director of Eastman Opera
- Leona Mitchell, Grammy Award-winning operatic soprano and an Oklahoma Music Hall of Fame inductee who sang for 18 seasons at the Metropolitan Opera
- Chris Merritt, operatic tenor
- Kelli O'Hara, Tony Award-winning actress and singer most known for her work on the Broadway and opera stages
- Ewa Plonka, Polish operatic soprano
- Susan Powell, actress, coloratura soprano, and television personality who was Miss America 1981
- Ron Raines, actor on stage and screen known for the role of Alan Spaulding on the television soap opera Guiding Light
- W. Stephen Smith, voice teacher and author, Northwestern University Professor of Voice and Opera
- Gerald Steichen, music conductor, pianist and stage actor
- Lara Teeter, dancer, actor, singer, theatre director and college professor
- Mason Williams, classical guitarist, composer, singer, writer, comedian, and poet
