= Chamber Opera Theater of New York =

American opera company

The Chamber Opera Theater of New York was an American opera company located in New York City that operated from 1980 to 1986. The company mainly staged its works at the Marymount Manhattan Theater, but occasionally used other venues like the Brooklyn Academy of Music. Music critic Allan Kozinn stated in The New York Times that the company "built a reputation for intimately staged productions, mostly of works that are rarely heard in the larger houses; and earned both a steady following and enthusiastic reviews."

Founded by Thaddeus Motyka, the company's inaugural performance was on March 21, 1980, with a double bill of Jacques Ibert's Angélique and William Walton's The Bear with Ainslee Cox conducting the Endymion Ensemble. While a consistent critical success, the company experienced financial problems through much of its history. Some of the company's financial problems were temporarily relieved through money generated by a benefit concert led by tenor Nicolai Gedda, soprano Elisabeth Söderström, and mezzo Gwendolyn Jones in 1983.

Other works the company staged included Ermanno Wolf-Ferrari's Il segreto di Susanna (1980), Gian Carlo Menotti's The Old Maid and the Thief (1980), Antonio Salieri's Prima la musica e poi le parole (1981), Nikolai Rimsky-Korsakov's Mozart and Salieri (1982), Francesco Cavalli's L'Ormindo (1982), Benjamin Britten's The Turn of the Screw (1982), Thea Musgrave's Voice of Ariadne (1983), Britten's Curlew River (1984), Ottorino Respighi's La bella dormente nel bosco (1985), and Donizetti's Don Pasquale (1985), In 1986 the company presented its last work, the United States premiere of Alexander Dargomyzhsky's The Stone Guest.
