= The Princeton Festival =

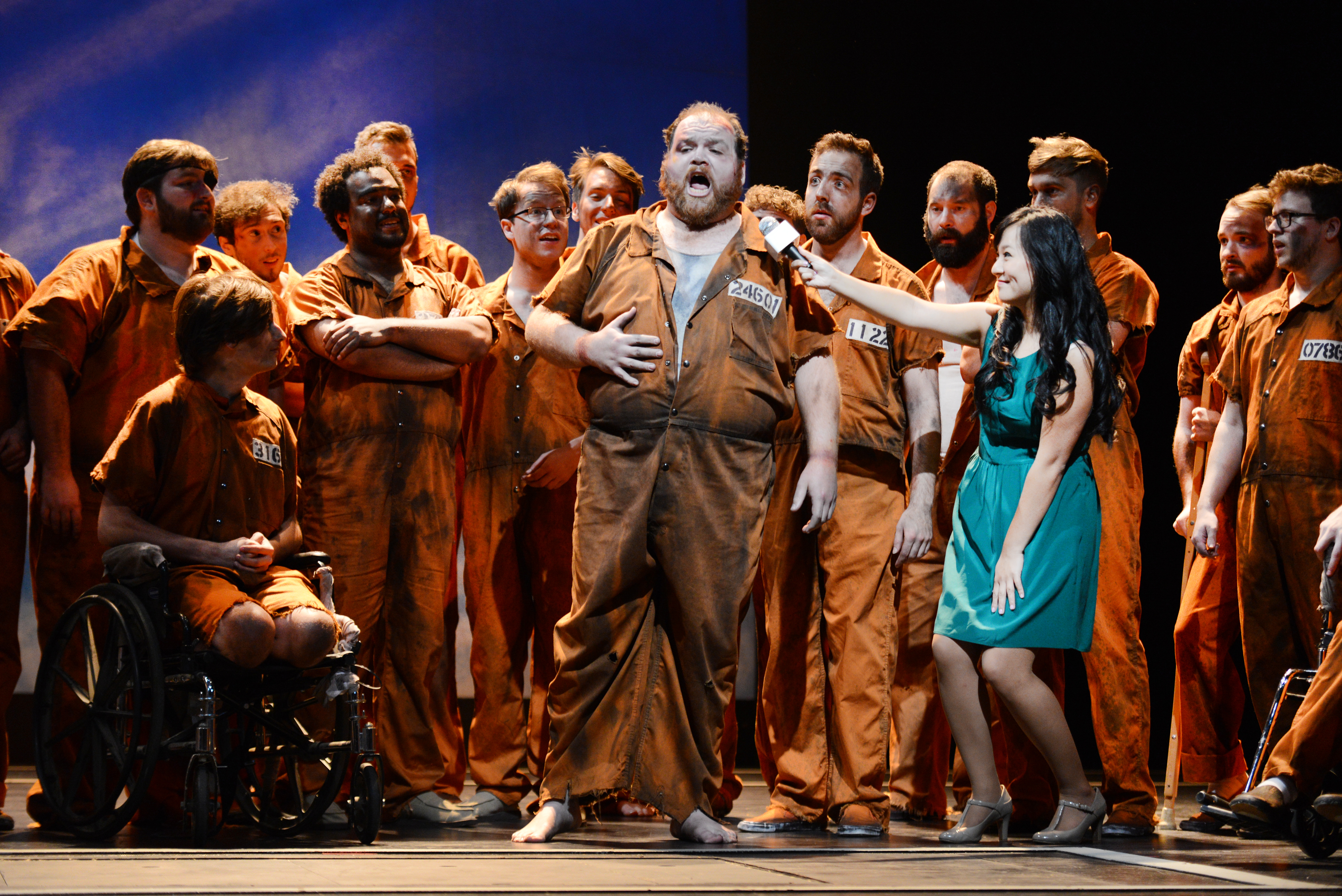
- Noah Baetge as Florestan in The Princeton Festival's performance of Fidelio (2017)
- Status: Active
- Genre: Festival
- Frequency: Annually
- Venue: Various
- Location: Princeton, New Jersey
- Coordinates: 40.358244°N 74.666728°W
- Country: United States
- Founded: 2004
- Founder: Richard Tang Yuk
- Website: princetonsymphony.org/festival

The Princeton Festival is a performing arts company located in Princeton, in Mercer County, New Jersey, United States. The festival typically takes place over the course of three weeks in June and consists of opera, musical theater, chamber music, jazz, dance, drama, and more.

== History ==
The Princeton Festival was launched in 2004 by its founding artistic director Richard Tang Yuk, who had formerly served as the Assistant Conductor of the Opera Festival of New Jersey. Recognizing the need not only for opera but diverse programming capable of reaching a larger audience in the area, Richard Tang Yuk assembled a program of five events to run in the summer of 2005, which culminated in a performance of Sweeney Todd. Over the years, the festival has grown to encompass as many as fifty different events at venues across central New Jersey, adding public lectures, master classes, and a piano competition to the traditional performing arts lineup.

== Production ==
The Princeton Festival is known for alternating traditional opera works with more modern pieces that are rarely staged in the New Jersey area. Past notable performances include John Adams' Nixon in China, Gershwin's Porgy and Bess, Handel's Ariodante, Stravinsky's The Rake's Progress, and Britten's A Midsummer Night's Dream, the last of which was praised by The New York Times for its strong cast and imaginative production style. For four consecutive years, The Princeton Festival received the People's Choice Award from the Jersey Arts organization, in recognition of the highest quality opera produced in the state of New Jersey.

Common performance venues include Miller Chapel, the Lewis Center for the Arts, Princeton University Chapel, Richardson Auditorium, the Princeton Abbey, and Taplin Auditorium. Though the opera and musical theater performances are cast nationally, The Princeton Festival also partners with local groups such as LustigDanceTheatre, Bucks County Choral Society, VOICES Chorale, Concordia Chamber Players, Jazz Nights, and The Westminster Solo Vocal Institute, in order to offer a broader range of orchestration and programming. The Princeton Festival Baroque Orchestra was introduced in 2015 and regularly performs a wide cross section of music from the baroque period.

== Organization ==
The Festival is a 501(c)(3) non-profit organization made possible by funds from the National Endowment for the Arts, Art Works, and New Jersey State Council on the Arts, among other groups and foundations. Additional annual fundraisers are held in the Princeton area to support musical programming. The Princeton Festival is not connected to Princeton University, though some of their performances take place in University venues.
