= My Own Words =

2016 book by Ruth Bader Ginsburg

- Author: Ruth Bader Ginsburg; Mary Hartnett; Wendy W. Williams
- Language: English
- Genre: Nonfiction
- Publisher: Simon & Schuster
- Publication date: October 4, 2016
- Publication place: United States
- ISBN: 978-1501145247

My Own Words is a 2016 book by American Supreme Court Justice Ruth Bader Ginsburg and her biographers Mary Hartnett and Wendy W. Williams. The book is a collection of Bader Ginsburg's speeches and writings dating back to the eighth grade. It was Bader Ginsburg's first book since becoming a Supreme Court Justice in 1993.

== Background ==
In March 2016, Simon & Schuster announced My Own Words was slated to release in January 2017. The book was released early on October 4, 2016.

== Synopsis ==
Bader Ginsburg writes the preface to the book, with Hartnett and Williams contextualizing "each part of the sections, which include law review articles, speeches, briefs and dissents." Many topics are covered in My Own Words, including Bader Ginsburg's life as a Jewish woman, gender equality, the Supreme Court, and interpreting the U.S. Constitution. One chapter consists of excerpts from Derrick Wang's opera Scalia/Ginsburg, with forewords by Ginsburg and Justice Antonin Scalia.

One of the treatises in the book is the speech she gave when accepting the position of Supreme Court Justice. Another is a writing on why the United States needs the Equal Rights Amendment.

Bader Ginsburg also recalls her relationship with Sandra Day O'Connor and Antonin Scalia. The book quotes Scalia when he was asked of his friendship with Ginsburg, "some very good people have some very bad ideas." Of O'Connor, Bader Ginsburg said the justice would "waste no time on anger, regret or resentment, just get the job done."

== Reception ==
Reception for the book was generally positive.

USA Today stated, "What emerges is not a portrait of a take-no-prisoners advocate but a strategic legal plotter who understands how to bring her audience around to her point of view."

Kirkus Reviews stated, "Only the most dedicated Ginsburg fans, and there are many, will devour everything here, but most readers will find items of interest from this icon of women’s rights."

Yahoo! News stated, "In My Own Words... the vim and vigor that she is famous for expressing from the Supreme Court bench is just as apparent in her high school editorials."

The New Republic stated, "The selection showcases her astonishing intellectual range, from law and lawyers in opera, to tributes to Louis Brandeis, William Rehnquist, and Gloria Steinem, to the significance and form of dissenting opinions."
