= Carroll Freeman =

American opera singer

Carroll Freeman is an American operatic tenor, opera director, and music educator. He began his career as a prominent boy soprano in the 1960s. From the late 1970s through the mid 1990s he performed widely as a tenor with opera companies and orchestras in the United States. After that he worked as a director of opera productions with opera companies throughout North America. He is the former director of the opera program at the University of Tennessee and currently directs the opera program at Georgia State University. He is also the former Artistic Director of Mississippi Opera, Opera in the Ozarks at Inspiration Point, and opera studios at Knoxville Opera and Des Moines Metro Opera.

== Life and career ==
Born in Memphis, Tennessee, Freeman was a boy soprano in the Columbus Boychoir, currently known as the American Boychoir, attending the school in Princeton, New Jersey. With that group he toured the United States, Canada, and Japan. Other performance opportunities as a child performer followed, including the lead role of Peter in “Peter, the Chorister” on the CBS-TV series Look Up and Live in 1966. His other work as a boy soprano included soloing in The Chichester Psalms with the New York Philharmonic under the baton of Leonard Bernstein at Philharmonic Hall, performances as Jano in Jenufa with the New York Little Orchestra Society, the First Spirit in the acclaimed Beni Montresor production of The Magic Flute, starring Beverly Sills, John Reardon, conducted by Julius Rudel at New York City Opera (NYCO), and a solo appearance on NBC-TV The Bell Telephone Hour.

Freeman earned a Bachelor of Music in vocal performance from the University of Southern Mississippi and a Master of Performing Arts in opera performance from Oklahoma City University. After summers with the Merola Program (San Francisco Opera) and Wolf Trap, he joined Texas Opera Theater, the touring arm of Houston Grand Opera. Subsequently, he became one of the first members of the Houston Opera Studio (David Gockley and Carlisle Floyd, co-directors) where he made his debut as the Male Chorus in Britten's The Rape of Lucretia in 1979. In 1977, he previously appeared as Little Bat in Floyd's Susannah at the Lyric Opera of Kansas City, a company with which he subsequently performed often.

In 1980 Freeman portrayed Leo Hubbard in Marc Blitzstein's Regina at the HGO. Other roles with HGO included Tamino, Don Ramiro, Count Ory, Almaviva, Leandro, Schmidt, Valzacchi, and Silas Barnaby. In June 1982 he created the role of Katz in the world premiere of Stephen Paulus's The Postman Always Rings Twice at the Opera Theatre of Saint Louis (OTSL). He subsequently performed the role of Katz at the Edinburgh Festival, in its European debut, and the Boston Lyric Opera. In 1984 he returned to the OTSL to portray Hot Biscuit Slim in Britten's Paul Bunyan directed by Colin Graham.

In October 1982 he made his adult debut with the NYCO as Alfredo in Verdi's La traviata with Diana Soviero as Violetta. He subsequently returned to the NYCO as Fritz in Jacques Offenbach's La Grande-Duchesse de Gérolstein and Nanki-Poo in The Mikado. He performed several times at Carnegie Hall, and, in 1984 he appeared at Avery Fisher Hall as Zadok the High Priest and the Levite in Handel's Solomon with Musica Sacra, starring Kathleen Battle.

In 1990 Freeman recorded the role of Don Ottavio in Wolfgang Amadeus Mozart's Don Giovanni for ORF television with the Vienna Symphony Orchestra, the Arnold Schoenberg Choir, and conductor Craig Smith for Decca. The work reset Don Giovanni in 1990s South Bronx, was directed by Peter Sellars, and was broadcast internationally on PBS' Great Performances, ORF, and BBC Television. He also appeared with Sellars' production in New York and Paris. Freeman was featured on Pro Arte's H.M.S. Gilbert & Sullivan, praised by CD Review as "one of the best CDs of 1990".

Freeman's other performance credits as a tenor include appearances in leading roles with Atlanta Opera, Baltimore Opera, Florida Grand Opera, Kentucky Opera, Michigan Opera Theater, Minnesota Opera, New Orleans Opera, Opera Omaha, Opera Pacific, Portland Opera, Fort Worth Opera, and San Diego Opera among others. He has also appeared in concerts with Eduardo Mata and the Dallas Symphony, with Leonard Slatkin and the St. Louis Symphony, Sergiù Comissiona and the Houston Symphony, the Minnesota Orchestra, the National Symphony Orchestra, and the Philadelphia Orchestra, among others. Opera and music festivals where Freeman has been featured include Pepsico Summerfare, ArtPark, Central City Opera, Wolf Trap, Chautauqua Opera, Lake George Opera, Saratoga Springs, and Des Moines Metro Opera, where he starred in two Iowa Public Television broadcasts. His most notable accomplishment among his several Asian performances is the Japanese premiere of Joruri by Minoru Miki (and Colin Graham).

Freeman has directed operas for the El Paso Opera, the Lyric Opera of Dallas, Knoxville Opera, Mobile Opera, Nashville Opera, Opera Grand Rapids, Phoenix Opera, Mississippi Opera, and Tulsa Opera among others. International and American programs where he has directed and taught include the American Institute of Musical Studies, Graz, Austria; La Musica Lirica, Novafeltria, Italy; the Greek Opera Studio of the Aegean Festival, Athens and Syros, Greece; the Festival of International Opera, Campinas, Brazil; Beveren Summer Singing Course, Antwerp, Belgium; the MusikHochschule Lübeck, Germany; Rising Star Vocal Works, Rising Sun, IN; and OBVI, Wichita Falls, TX. His dedication to the training of young operatic artists has taken him to Cleveland Institute, UMKC, Kansas University, SFASU, and OCU, and he is a frequent judge for the Metropolitan Opera National Council Auditions. He has twice been honored with National Opera Institute Awards, given by Beverly Sills and Hal Prince, with a Presidential Citation from the National Federation of Music Clubs, and Classical Singer magazine as their "2010 Stage Director of the Year".

He is currently the Valerie Adams Distinguished Professor of Opera Studies at Georgia State University, where he also serves as artistic director for the Harrower Summer Opera Workshop.
