= Leona Mitchell =

American opera singer

Leona Pearl Mitchell (born October 13, 1949, Enid, Oklahoma) is an American operatic soprano who sang for 18 seasons as a leading spinto soprano at the Metropolitan Opera in New York.

In her home state of Oklahoma, she received many honors. These include the Oklahoma Hall of Fame, the Oklahoma Music Hall of Fame, the Oklahoma Women's Hall of Fame and the Oklahoma Jazz Hall of Fame. She received honorary doctorates from Oklahoma City University and the University of Oklahoma. In 1983, she was inducted into the Oklahoma Women's Hall of Fame.

Her home town of Enid has a street named after her called Leona Mitchell Boulevard, as well as the Leona Mitchell Southern Heights Heritage Center and Museum. Governor Brad Henry of Oklahoma made her Oklahoma's State Cultural Ambassador.

== Early life and education ==
Mitchell started singing at an early age in the choir of the Antioch Church of God in Christ in Enid, where her father, Reverend Dr. Hulon Mitchell, was the Minister along with her mother, Dr. Pearl Olive Mitchell (née Leatherman), who was the pianist. Leona was the tenth-born of Hulon and Pearl Mitchell's 15 children.

One of her elder brothers, Hulon Mitchell Jr., was better known as Yahweh ben Yahweh, leader of the Nation of Yahweh.

Leona Mitchell received a BA in music from Oklahoma City University where she was a student of Inez Silberg. She went on to graduate studies at the Juilliard School of Music in New York. She married Elmer Bush III, by whom she had one son, Elmer Bush IV.

== Professional career ==
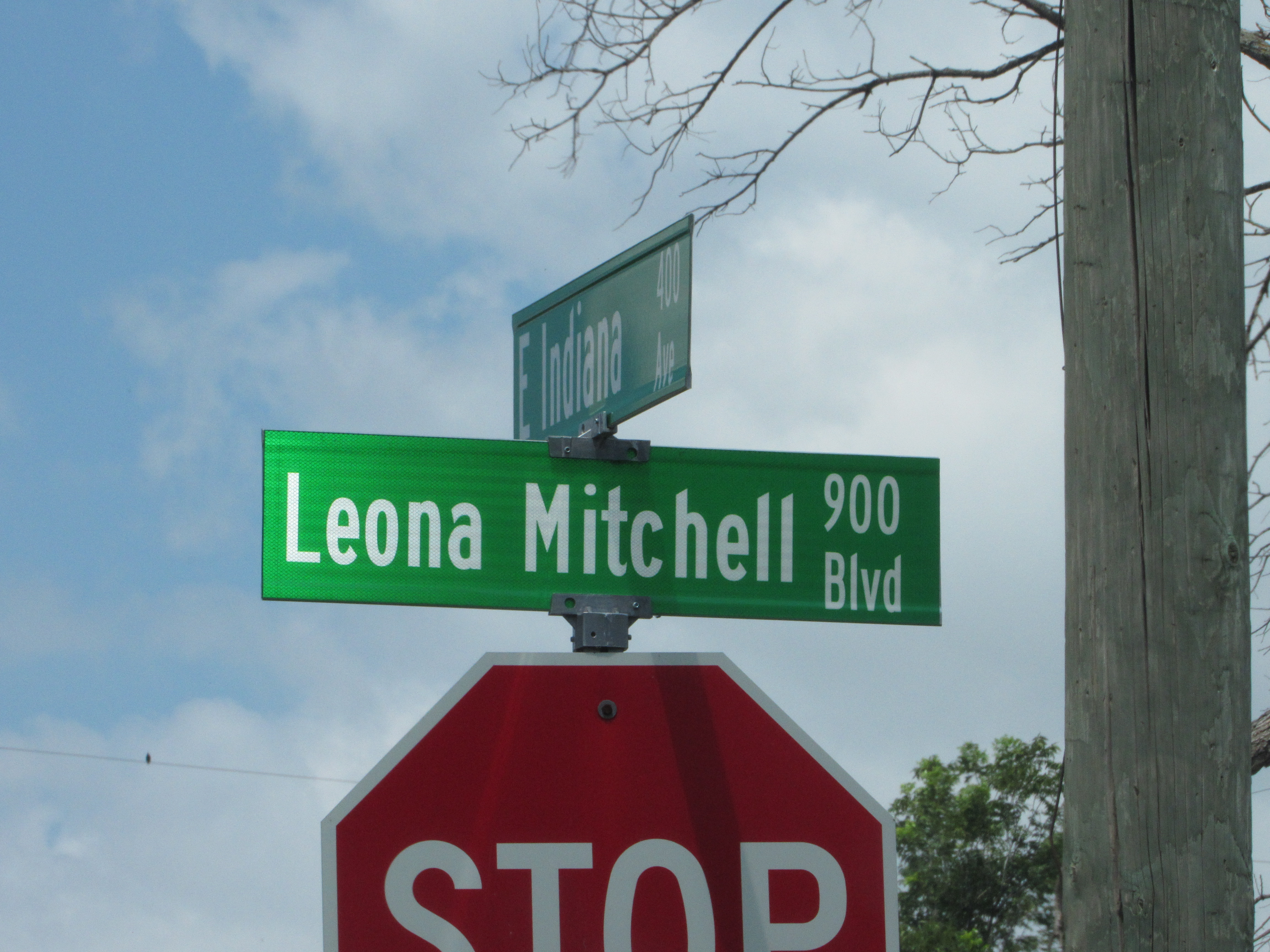
Leona Mitchell Blvd in Enid, Oklahoma

In 1973, she made her debut as Micaela in Georges Bizet's 1875 opera Carmen with the San Francisco Opera, subsequently she made her Metropolitan Opera debut in New York City on December 15, 1975 in the same role. She sang the role of Bess in the first complete recording of George Gershwin's Porgy and Bess from which she received a Grammy for "Best Opera Recording".

Mitchell has contributed to several recordings, had many television appearances, and served as honorary chair for Black Heritage Month to the Oklahoma legislature.

In 1987, Mitchell performed the role of Liù from Turandot, directed by Franco Zeffirelli, at the Metropolitan Opera. She collaborated with many great conductors, including Zubin Mehta, Lorin Maazel, James Levine, and Seiji Ozawa.

She was a leading soprano with the Metropolitan Opera of New York for 18 seasons. She sang at most of the world's best-known opera houses in such roles as Turandot, Aida, Micaela, Manon, Leonora, Amalia Delilah, Mimi, and Musetta, as well as Pamina, Madama Butterfly, Lauretta, and Madame Lidoine.

She performed for five U.S. Presidents: Ronald Reagan, Gerald Ford, Jimmy Carter, Bill Clinton and George H. W. Bush, along with many dignitaries which include Prince Charles, Princess Anne, The Honourable Sandra Day O'Connor, and Bishop Desmond Tutu.

On July 5, 1986, she performed in the New York Philharmonic tribute to the 100th Anniversary of the Statue of Liberty, which was televised live from Central Park on ABC Television. She sang both the aria "Un bel dì vedremo" from Puccini's Madama Butterfly, and the American spiritual "He's Got the Whole World in His Hands". She appeared in a production with each one of the Three Tenors: Ernani with Luciano Pavarotti, Turandot with Plácido Domingo, and Carmen with José Carreras.

She appeared on such televised broadcasts as The Merv Griffin Show, The Dick Cavett Show, and The Jerry Lewis Telethon.

== Videography ==
- The Metropolitan Opera Centennial Gala, Deutsche Grammophon DVD, 00440-073-4538, 2009
- Puccini: Turandot / Metropolitan Opera, Deutsche Grammonphon DVD, 073-058-9, 1989
