= Florence Birdwell =

American educator, musician, and singer (1924–2021)

Florence Gillam Birdwell (September 3, 1924 – February 15, 2021), sometimes referred to as Flo Birdwell, was an American educator, musician, and singer. She taught musical theater and opera singing for more than six decades. She served as a professor of voice at the Bass School of Music at Oklahoma City University from 1946 to 2013, and afterwards periodically teaching master classes as a professor emerita.

In 2024, the National Association of Teachers of Singers honored Birdwell's career and contributions by naming the first prize of its annual National Musical Theatre Competition "The Florence Birdwell Award." The competition, held in New York City and featuring O'Hara as honorary host, took place on Jan. 8, 2024.

== Life and career ==
She not only taught me to sing technically, but taught me to sing from the soul about what a song actually means.

Don't sing it if ya can't mean it!

— Kristin Chenoweth

Born Florence Gillam Hobin in Douglas, Arizona, Birdwell was the daughter of Warner and Grace (Gillam) Hobin. She was raised in Santa Fe, New Mexico, and Lawton, Oklahoma. She studied voice under Inez Silberg at Oklahoma City University (OCU), where she earned undergraduate (1945) and graduate degrees. After additional instruction, Birdwell returned to OCU where she joined the voice faculty.

Upon her death in 2021 at the age of 96, The New York Times noted that during her 67 years as an OCU faculty member, she established "herself as a dramatic, no-nonsense mentor. She helped aspiring musical theater and opera singers unlock the mysteries of captivating an audience, but she could also make her students weep with her candid feedback on their progress."

Birdwell received the state's highest arts honor, the Governor's Arts Award in 1985 from Oklahoma Governor George Nigh. In 1990, OCU established the Florence Birdwell Vocal Scholarship Fund in her honor. In 2004, she was recognized as a Member Laureate of Sigma Alpha Iota, an international music fraternity for women. In March 2007, Starry Night, a musical tribute to her lengthy teaching career, was held as a fundraising event to fund an endowed chair in Birdwell's name at the university.

Birdwell's students have included Kristin Chenoweth, Kelli O'Hara, Lara Teeter and Miss America 1981 Susan Powell.

When both Chenoweth (starring as Lily Garland in On the Twentieth Century) and O'Hara (starring as Anna Leonowens in The King and I) were nominated by the Tony Awards in 2015 for the Best Lead Actress in a Musical, The New York Times assigned a reporter and photographer to cover Birdwell's arrival and subsequent masterclass in New York City. Sarah Lyall's account noted: "The word 'legend' is thrown around too blithely on Broadway — everyone seems to be some sort of legend — but at her age and with her track record (dozens of former students in the business, two currently competing against each other for a Tony Award), Mrs. Birdwell might well qualify. In 67 years of teaching at Oklahoma City University, from 1946 to 2013, Mrs. Birdwell amassed an adoring fan base. Her students have never really stopped being her students."

The Times' feature concluded with Birdwell sharing her philosophy on the importance of being tough on students preparing for a career as a performer. "Mrs. Birdwell has had people run from her classes, weeping hysterically, never to return. 'That’s life,' she said. 'If they can’t take the criticism they’ve asked for — then don’t come.'Also, she said, not everyone is cut out to be performer. 'There are other fields,' Mrs. Birdwell said. 'With one girl I said, "Go to cooking school," ' she recalled. 'And therapy! Everybody should go to therapy.'”
