= Opera Delaware =

American Opera Company

OperaDelaware is a professional opera company located in Wilmington, Delaware. The company was founded in 1944 and is the eleventh oldest professional opera companies in the United States. Originally known as the Wilmington Opera Society, it was established by Chick Laird, a member of the du Pont family. To date the company has staged 198 productions of 104 operas by 55 composers. Opera Delaware has also presented 19 world premieres (18% of their repertoire) and three U.S. premieres. The company has recently undergone a transition to a festival season in May and has frequently received positive reviews for its productions in such publications as Opera News and the New York Times. Opera News writes, "Opera Delaware continues to provide quality productions that both entertain and involve the community it serves... superbly produced and led by an all around stellar cast." The company performs its productions at the historic Grand Opera House.

== See also ==
- Music of Delaware
