= Oklahoma City University =

Private university in Oklahoma City, Oklahoma, U.S.

Coordinates: 35°29′41″N 97°32′29″W

- Former names: Epworth College (1904–1911); Methodist University of Oklahoma (1911–1919); Oklahoma City College (1919–1924)
- Motto: Veritas Ecclesia Cognitio
- Motto in English: Truth, Church, and Knowledge
- Type: Private university
- Established: 1904; 122 years ago
- Religious affiliation: United Methodist Church
- Academic affiliations: CIC; IAMSCU; NAICU
- Endowment: $94.98 million
- President: Kenneth R. Evans
- Students: 2,748
- Undergraduates: 1,619
- Postgraduates: 1,129
- Location: Oklahoma City, Oklahoma, United States
- Campus: 104 acres (0.42 km^{2}); Urban
- Colors: Blue and white
- Nickname: Stars
- Sporting affiliations: NAIA – Sooner
- Mascot: Starsky the Ram
- Website: okcu.edu
- Oklahoma City University
- U.S. National Register of Historic Places
- U.S. Historic district
- NRHP reference No.: 78002247
- Added to NRHP: December 19, 1978

Oklahoma City University (OCU) is a private university in Oklahoma City, Oklahoma, United States. It is affiliated with the United Methodist Church.

The university offers undergraduate bachelor's degrees, graduate master's degrees and doctoral degrees, and is organized into eight colleges and schools and one Methodist seminary. More than 70 undergraduate majors are offered, as well as 20 graduate degrees, including a JD, MBA, and PhD in Nursing. An Adult Studies Program for working adults offers a Bachelor of Science or Bachelor of Arts degree. The university has approximately 3,000 students, including 1,200 graduate students. The official school and athletic colors are blue and white.

== History ==
=== Early history ===
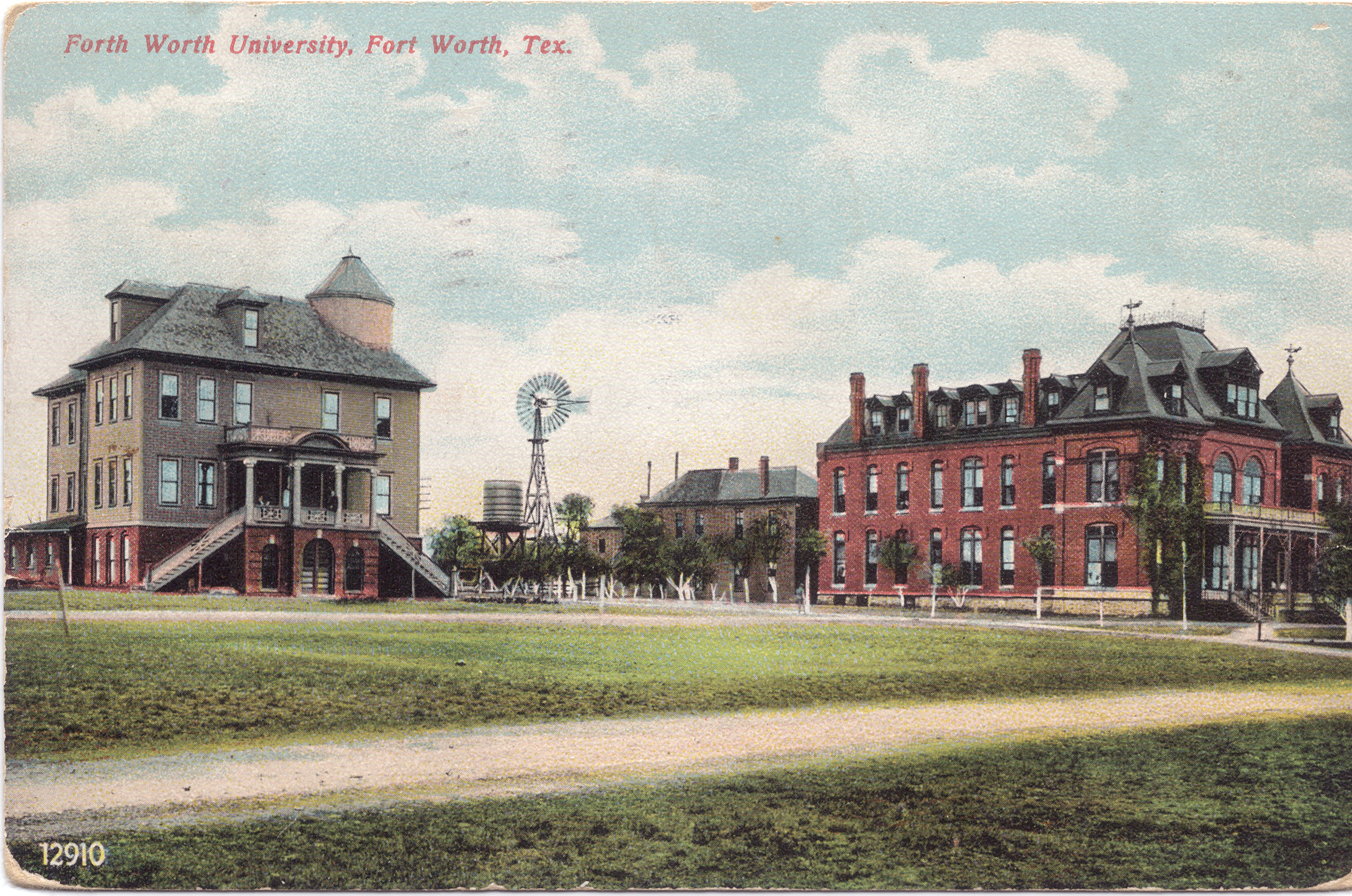
Postcard of Fort Worth University, 1908

Oklahoma City University began as "Epworth University", a project by local developer Anton H. Classen, who sought to begin a Methodist university in conjunction with other development projects. Construction began in 1902 and the school opened in 1904, three years before statehood, with an enrollment of 100 students. Anton Classen was heavily involved with development of early Oklahoma City and advanced the idea of a Methodist university in Oklahoma and helped spark the ideas of the Methodist Church to establish a Methodist university in Oklahoma. Construction began in 1902 and classes started in 1904 with enrollment growing by almost 100 students during that first year.

Epworth closed in 1911 after the school ran into financial difficulties. The church then formed "Methodist University of Oklahoma" in Guthrie, Oklahoma, which also absorbed a Methodist college in Texas, "Fort Worth University". Eventually, the school's trustees developed a plan to close the school in Guthrie and reopen in Oklahoma City. The school opened in Oklahoma City as "Oklahoma City College" in 1919, bolstered by funding from Methodist congregations. The college experienced rapid growth and changed its name to Oklahoma City University in 1924. Despite the success and growth of the university in the 1920s, OCU again fell on hard times during the Great Depression.

=== Post-war era ===
Dr. Cluster Smith became president of Oklahoma City University after the Great Depression. When the United States entered World War II, the school faced new challenges, including mounting debt and a need for new facilities. Enrollment dipped during the war, as men left campus to enlist in the military. By 1942, the student body was 75 percent female. This created a shortage of players and funds causing many of the athletic programs, such as the football team, to end operations. After the war, enrollment increased dramatically and the university began a period of rapid development through the remainder of the 1940s. In the 1950s, OCU received accreditation from the North Central Association of Colleges and Secondary Schools. The university then took control of the Oklahoma City College of Law and began a partnership with the Massachusetts Institute of Technology to elevate the academics and the quality of education. The Bishop W. Angie Smith Chapel was dedicated in 1968 as part of a plan to expand OCU's spiritual life.

In the mid-1970s, after nearly 25 years of steady growth, the university again fell on hard times. In 1976 United Methodist Bishop Paul Milhouse discussed the school's issues to the Annual Conference of Oklahoma United Methodist churches in Tulsa. After requesting that people direct their prayers and pledges to the university, by 1980 the Methodist Church had raised more than $3 million. Jerald Walker, an OCU alumnus, became president in 1979 and continued the university's growth stemming from the financial support from the Church. During his tenure as president facilities were improved, new academic programs were started and enrollment increased again. In 1981 it was announced that the university was out of debt and turned a surplus for the first time since 1975. The university added the School of Religion and the nursing program during the 1980s.

=== Recent history ===
In the 1990s, the university upgraded and renovated campus facilities. Stephen Jennings became president in 1998 and began focusing on the university's centennial celebration and position the university for the future. Under Jennings, OCU team names were changed from the Chiefs to the Stars and the university expanded student life, including the Distinguished Speakers Series. Tom McDaniel became president in 2001 and altered the look of the OCU campus from an influx of donations. New additions to the campus included The Ann Lacy Visitor and Admissions Center, the Norick Art Center, the Edith Kinney Gaylord Center, the Wanda L. Bass School of Music Center, Meinders School of Business, and a new residence hall. Robert Harlan Henry, chief judge of the United States Court of Appeals for the Tenth Circuit, became the university's 17th president in July 2010, succeeding Tom McDaniel. During Henry's tenure, the university has moved the OCU School of Law to an historic location in downtown Oklahoma City, renovated several academic facilities, and launched a Physician Assistant program. The 18th president of Oklahoma City University was Martha Burger, who served from 2018 to 2021. She was succeeded by Kenneth R. Evans, who had previously served as president of Lamar University.

The student housing on the campus will function as a satellite Olympic village during the 2028 Summer Olympics. Outside of Los Angeles, Oklahoma City will host softball and canoe slalom with those athletes being housed on the campus.

=== Historic designation ===
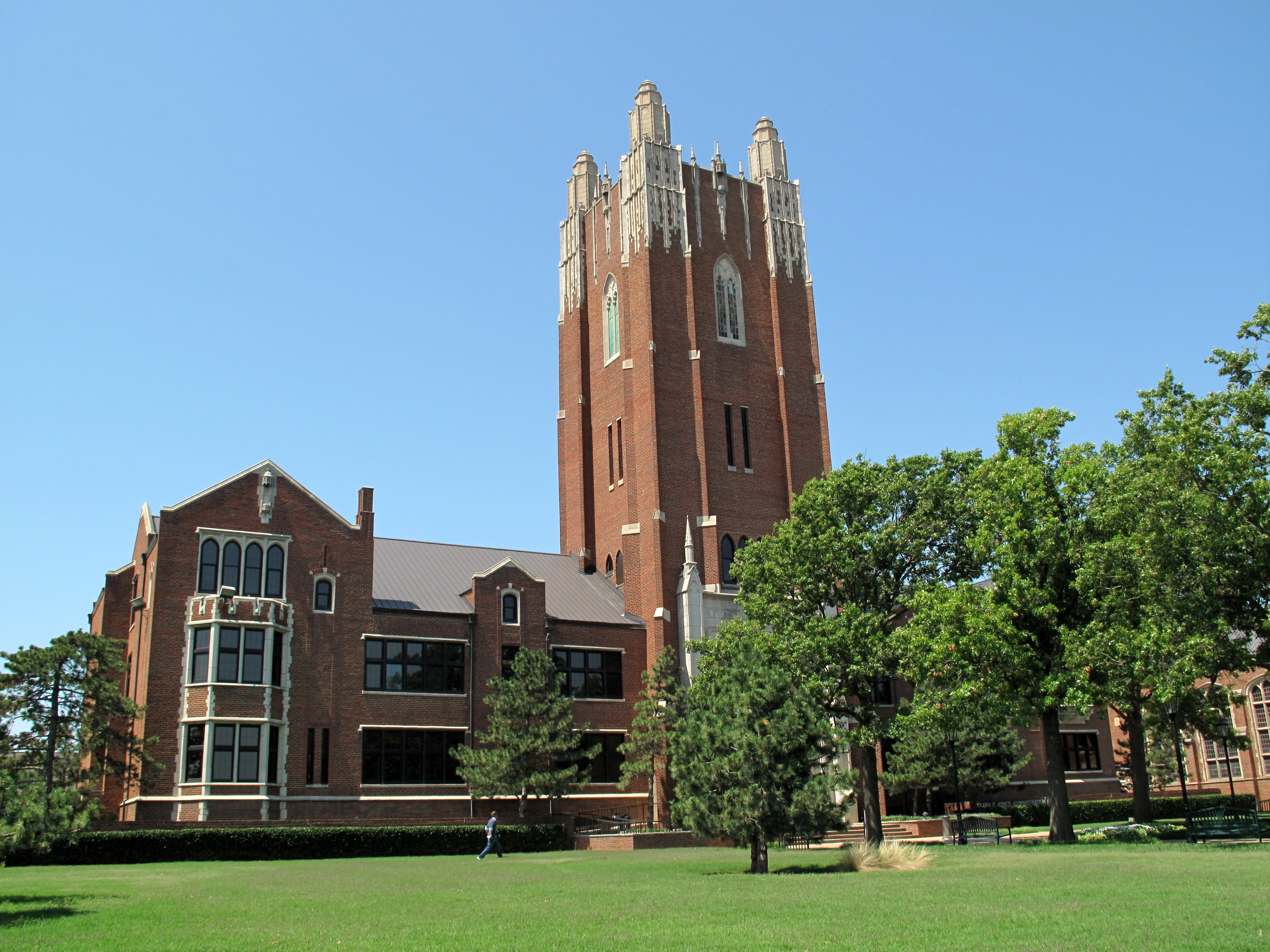
The Administration Building, included in the historic district

On December 19, 1978, part of the university campus was listed as a historic district on the National Register of Historic Places. The district comprises the Administration Building, the Fine Arts Building, and the Goldstar Building. It was nominated for its statewide significance in education and in the Methodist community.

== Campus ==
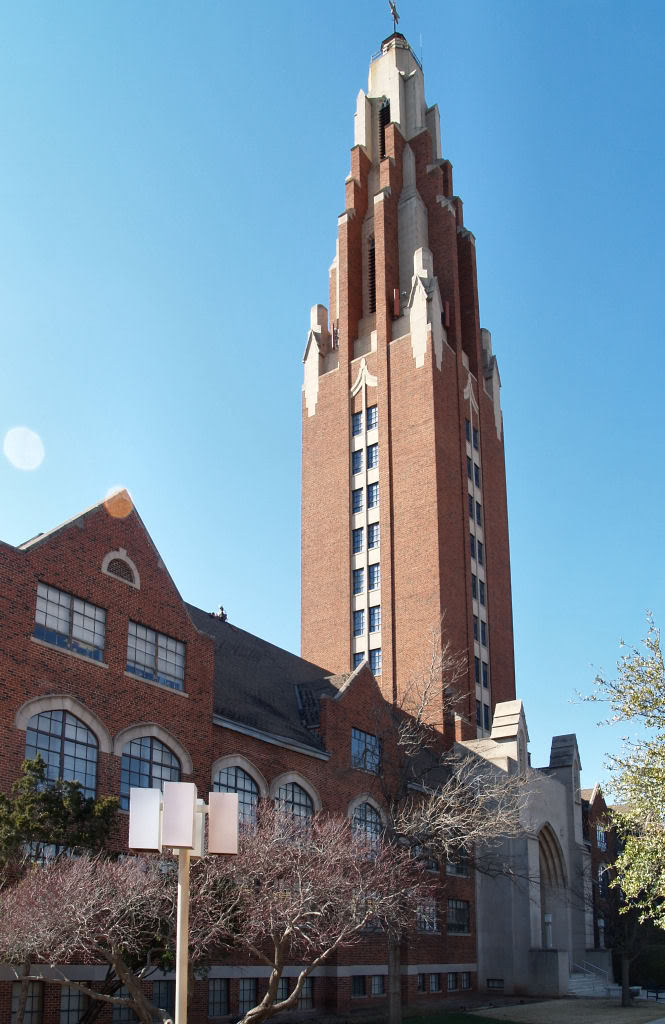
Gold Star Memorial Building (School of Religion, Honors College, School of Theater), an Oklahoma landmark

The 104-acre (0.42 km^{2}) campus lies in the Uptown area of central Oklahoma City north of downtown and immediately west of the Asia District, just a few miles due west of the Oklahoma State Capitol building on NW 23rd Street.

Prominent campus buildings include the Gold Star Memorial Building (School of Religion, Honors College, School of Theater ), Clara Jones Administration Building, Bishop W. Angie Smith Chapel, Sarkeys Science and Mathematics Center, Edith Kinney Gaylord Center (housing the Ann Lacy School of American Dance and Entertainment), Kirkpatrick Fine Arts Building, Dulaney-Browne Library, McDaniel University Center, Meinders School of Business and Henry K. Freede Wellness and Activity Center. The 38 million dollar state-of-the-art 113,000 sq ft (10,500 m^{2}) Wanda L. Bass Music Center was opened in April 2006.

OCU opened a 52,000 sq ft (4,800 m^{2}) addition to the Kramer School of Nursing in January 2011. The university purchased the historic Central High School building in downtown Oklahoma City in 2012 where the School of Law is now located.

The Kerr-McGee Centennial Plaza on the southeast corner of the campus was constructed in 2004 to celebrate the 100th anniversary of OCU. The plaza features bronze statues honoring OCU's three Miss America pageant winners. In the first decade of the 21st century, OCU completed more than $100 million in new campus construction.

=== Campus safety ===
OCU maintains a full-time on-campus police force to ensure a safe campus. In addition to normal duties and patrols, OCUPD are available to escort any student after dark. In addition, emergency call stations are strategically scattered throughout the campus providing immediate access to campus security.

== Academics ==
Academic rankings

National
- Forbes: 433

The university is classified as a Master's college and university by the Carnegie Classification of Institutions of Higher Education.

OCU is accredited by the Higher Learning Commission. In addition the nursing program is accredited by the National League for Nursing Accrediting Commission, the music program is accredited by the National Association of Schools of Music, the Montessori education program accredited by the Montessori Accreditation Council for Teacher Education, and the law school is accredited by the American Bar Association.

The university offers more than 70 undergraduate majors and 20 graduate degrees, including the MBA, the J.D., the MFA, two PhD programs in nursing, and the Adult Studies Program for working adults to earn a Bachelor of Science or Bachelor of Arts degree. The school also offers numerous pre-professional degrees, one such degree track is the Oxford Plan; successful participants qualify for preferred admission to the School of Law and participants with an LSAT score of 155 or higher and an undergraduate GPA of 3.5 or higher are guaranteed admission to the School of Law. In 2009 OCU launched its first doctoral programs in the university's history. OCU offers a Doctor of Nursing Practice and the PhD in Nursing through the Kramer School of Nursing.

OCU also offers professional graduate programs in physical therapy and physician assistant studies. The Doctor of Physical Therapy program matriculated its first cohort in 2020 and is accredited by the Commission on Accreditation in Physical Therapy Education (CAPTE). The Physician Assistant program was first accredited in 2015 and holds Accreditation-Continued status from the Accreditation Review Commission on Education for the Physician Assistant (ARC-PA).

Oklahoma City University also provides opportunities for further education with service learning components across the curriculum; a University Honors Program; OCULEADS, a freshman scholarship and leadership development program; a partnership with The Oklahoma Scholar-Leadership Enrichment Program (OSLEP), an intercollegiate, interdisciplinary program; a Center for Interpersonal Studies through Film and Literature; and numerous study abroad programs.

=== Colleges and schools by size ===
- Petree College of Arts & Sciences
- Meinders School of Business
- School of Law
- Kramer School of Nursing
- Wanda L. Bass School of Music
- School of Theatre
- Ann Lacy School of American Dance and Entertainment
- Wimberly School of Religion

=== Seminary ===
- Saint Paul School of Theology, headquartered in Kansas City, Missouri, offers courses on the Oklahoma City University campus.

== Athletics ==
OCU athletics logo

The Oklahoma City (OCU) athletic teams are called the Stars (formerly known the Methodists prior to 1921, as the Goldbugs prior to 1944, and the Chiefs from 1944 until 1999.). The university is a member of the National Association of Intercollegiate Athletics (NAIA), primarily competing in the Sooner Athletic Conference (SAC) for most of its sports since the 1986–87 academic year. The Stars previously competed at the NCAA Division I ranks, primarily competing in the Midwestern City Conference (MCC; now known as the Horizon League) from 1979–80 to 1984–85; and in the D-I Trans America Athletic Conference (TAAC; now known as the Atlantic Sun Conference) during the 1978–79 school year. Its women's wrestling team competed in the Women's College Wrestling Association (WCWA).

OCU competes in 18 intercollegiate varsity sports: Men's sports include baseball, basketball, cross country, golf, soccer, track & field and wrestling; while women's sports include basketball, cross country, golf, soccer, softball, stunt, track & field and volleyball; and co-ed sports include competitive cheer, competitive dance and rowing. Former sports included women's wrestling.

Under president Tom McDaniel the number of athletic teams doubled to 22. OCU is represented by "Starsky" the Ram; "Starsky" is inspired by the celestial lore surrounding the creation of OCU. OCU teams have won 73 National Championships since 1988

A member of the NCAA until after the 1984–85 season, OCU made the NCAA Men's Division I Basketball Championship tournament 11 times and the National Invitation Tournament twice as an independent. Famous coaches of the past have beenb Abe Lemons and Doyle Parrack.

In 1984–85 OCU won the Midwestern City Conference baseball championship and made into the NCAA Division I Baseball Championship tournament before moving to the NAIA the next year.

In 2012, Kevin Patrick Hardy (Class of 2013), became OCU's first national champion in wrestling, capturing the national title at 165 pounds.

== Student life ==
Opportunities for cultural enrichment and entertainment on the OCU campus include concerts, play performances, operas, films, sporting events, and seminars by world-renowned speakers and business leaders. Guest speakers at OCU have included Archbishop Desmond Tutu, Nobel prize winner Elie Wiesel, author Kurt Vonnegut, playwright Edward Albee, researcher Jane Goodall, Rabbi Harold Kushner, Sister Helen Prejean, educator and author Jonathan Kozol, Poets Laureate Ted Kooser and Billy Collins, civil rights attorney Morris Dees, journalists Helen Thomas and George Will, U.S. Supreme Court Justice Sandra Day O'Connor, environmental activist Robert F. Kennedy Jr. and politician Karen Hughes.

A Wellness Program and Outdoor Adventures Program provide numerous opportunities for student activity such as pilates, yoga, traditional aerobics classes and self-defense, as well as hiking, bicycling, camping, horseback riding and sailing. A resource center and gear checkout are provided on campus. Intramural sports are a popular activity, with over 35 different sports available in league and tournament play and both coed and single-gender teams. Students have access to a full-size exercise facility, the Aduddell Center, located next to Centennial Hall.

The university's large numbers of international students add to a culture of diversity. The Office of Multicultural Affairs maintains organizations such as the Black Student Association, Hispanic Student Association, Native American Society, and the Asian American Student Association. The office also maintains international student associations such as the Indian Student Association, Korean Student Association, and Chinese Student Association.

The student body is represented by the Student Government Association, or SGA (formerly Student Senate). The OCU SGA consists of the Executive Branch, which includes the president and his staff and manages SGA; the Student Senate, which allots monies to student organizations and hears legislation; the Student Activities Committee, which oversees Homecoming and special events; the Judicial Branch, which deal with student disciplinary issues. The elections for SGA are held in April with special elections for freshman in the fall.

The Oklahoma City University Film Institute offers viewings of eight to ten classic international films per year. Written materials on the theme and films is available at each screening and the screenings are followed by a discussion of the film. The film series has been presented each year since 1982.

=== Traditions ===
OCU maintains several traditions, the largest being Homecoming in the fall. Homecoming, which is a week-long celebration, includes philanthropy events, concerts, floats and sporting events.

=== Newspapers, magazines and other media ===
The Campus is the official student newspaper of Oklahoma City University since 1907. It has won numerous state and national awards. It is produced by Student Publications, a part of the school's mass communications department.

The Scarab is a student anthology of writing and art, including non-fiction, fiction, poetry, and photography, published by OCU's chapter of the international English honor society Sigma Tau Delta and winner of the society's 2003–2004 award for Literary Arts Journal of the year.

=== Greek life ===
The university is home to several fraternities and sororities.

== Notable people ==
=== Faculty ===
More than 78 percent of OCU faculty members hold terminal degrees in their fields. All classes are taught by professors, and not graduate assistants. Student to faculty ratio is 13:1 and the average class size is 16 for freshmen and 12 for upperclassmen. Notable faculty have included:

- Florence Birdwell, OCU alumna; Professor of Voice from 1946–2013; mentor to Tony winners Kristin Chenoweth and Kelli O'Hara.
- Jo Rowan, dancer and educator, 42-year faculty member and founder of the Oklahoma City University dance program.
- Edward Knight, Professor of Music/Composer in Residence at the Wanda L. Bass School of Music. Founder of the new music group/composer consortium Project 21: Music for the 21st Century, established in 1997.
- Sergio Monteiro, international Steinway concert artist and Director of Piano at the Wanda L. Bass School of Music; winner of the Martha Agerich International Piano Competition in Buenos Aires and recording artist with Naxos Records.
- Abe Lemons, OCU men's basketball coach 1955–73 and 1983–90. Winner of the 1989 Basketball Times Coach of the Year and the 1989 Jim Thorpe Lifetime Achievement Award.
- David Holt, OCU alumnus; Dean of the Oklahoma City University School of Law and the 38th mayor of Oklahoma City.
- Robert Harlan Henry, former U.S. Circuit Judge, Attorney General of Oklahoma, and dean of Oklahoma City University School of Law. 17th President of Oklahoma City University.
- Enoch Kelly Haney, OCU alumnus; artist, politician, Principal Chief of the Seminole Nation, 2005–2009.
- Robin Meyers, author, Christian minister, peace activist and Distinguished Professor of Social Justice in the Philosophy Department.
- Lou Berney, educator and author of five novels; Edgar Award winner.
- Inez Silberg, head of the voice faculty at OCU for fifteen years; teacher of many famous singers who studied at OCU
- Marvel Williamson, researcher, author and Dean of OCU's Kramer School of Nursing.
- Jim Roth, former dean of the Oklahoma City University School of Law, former member of the Oklahoma Corporation Commission and the first openly LGBTQIA+ person to hold a statewide elected office in Oklahoma.
