= Villain (1971 film) =

1971 film by Michael Tuchner

- DVD cover
- Directed by: Michael Tuchner
- Written by: Dick Clement; Ian La Frenais; Al Lettieri (adaptation)
- Based on: The Burden of Proof; 1968 novel by James Barlow
- Produced by: Jay Kanter; Alan Ladd, Jr. Elliott Kastner (executive producer)
- Starring: Richard Burton; Ian McShane; Nigel Davenport; Donald Sinden; Fiona Lewis; T. P. McKenna; Joss Ackland; Cathleen Nesbitt; Colin Welland
- Cinematography: Christopher Challis
- Edited by: Ralph Sheldon
- Music by: Jonathan Hodge
- Production company: Anglo-EMI
- Distributed by: MGM-EMI
- Release date: 26 May 1971
- Running time: 98 minutes
- Country: United Kingdom
- Language: English
- Budget: £383,786
- Box office: over £1 million (UK) (est.)

Villain is a 1971 British gangster film directed by Michael Tuchner and starring Richard Burton, Ian McShane, Nigel Davenport and Donald Sinden. It is based on James Barlow's 1968 novel The Burden of Proof. Villain was director Michael Tuchner's first feature film after directing in television.

== Plot ==
Vic Dakin is a ruthless and sadistic London gangster. Dakin’s vicious behavior toward his associates and rivals is contrasted by his care for his elderly mother, who seems unaware of his criminal activities. Dakin is planning an ambitious robbery of a delivery of wages to a factory, but the heist will take place in the territory of Dakin's rival, Frank Fletcher, requiring Fletcher's agreement. They agree that Fletcher and his brother-in-law, Edgar Lowis, will accompany Dakin and his crew on the robbery.

Police detective Bob Matthews and his colleague, Tom Binney, are pursuing Dakin and keep tabs on him through an informant, Danny, in Dakin’s circle of associates. Minor underworld figure Wolfe deals in drugs and supplies girls to an aristocrat who hosts sex parties at his mansion. Wolfe is in debt to Dakin after losing money, and Dakin uses him for sex.

The robbery goes ahead, but Fletcher is badly injured in the process. The gang split up and agree to meet later and divide the money. Matthews and Binney quickly arrest Lowis, whose fingerprints have been found at the scene. On Dakin’s behalf, Wolfe sets up Draycott, a member of parliament and a participant in the sex parties, using compromising photos to pressure him into giving Dakin an alibi for the robbery.

Dakin comes to suspect that Lowis has double crossed the crew and taken the money. Through Danny, Matthews feeds Dakin information that Lowis has been transferred to hospital on account of an ulcer. Dakin has his men abduct Lowis, then threatens to kill him unless he gives him the money. Lowis takes Dakin and the others to a disused building but cannot find the money. The police have followed them and when they move in, Dakin shoots Lowis dead. While the others attempt, and fail, to make their escape, Dakin and Wolfe are last to be caught.

When Dakin is arrested, he defiantly tells Matthews that he will beat the charges through intimidation of the jury. Dakin looks around at onlookers and angrily shouts, "Who are you looking at?!"

== Cast ==
- Richard Burton as Vic Dakin
- Ian McShane as Wolfe Lissner
- Nigel Davenport as Bob Matthews
- Donald Sinden as Gerald Draycott
- Fiona Lewis as Venetia
- T. P. McKenna as Frank Fletcher
- Joss Ackland as Edgar Lowis
- Cathleen Nesbitt as Mrs Dakin
- Colin Welland as Tom Binney
- Elizabeth Knight as Patti
- Tony Selby as Duncan
- Del Henney as Webb
- James Cossins as Brown
- John Hallam as Terry
- Anthony Sagar as Danny
- Clive Francis as Vivian
- Shirley Cain as Mrs Matthews

== Production ==
In November 1969 EMI Films announced a movie would be made of Burden of Proof as part of a slate of eight films from Anglo-EMI under Nat Cohen. Other movies would be The Impotent with Carol White and Malcolm McDowell, The Practice from a novel by Stanley Winchester, Jam Today from a novel by Susan Barrett, My Family and other Animals from a book by Gerald Durrell, Wise Child from Simon Gray's play and Percy about a penis transplant. Of these only Percy and Burden of Proof would be made. Sale of the film rights earned Barlow £12,500. He would die in January 1973.

=== Writing ===
The script was written by British comedy writers Dick Clement and Ian La Frenais. They worked from a treatment by American actor Al Lettieri, renowned for his tough-guy image in films such as The Godfather (1972) and The Getaway (1972) as well as for his real-life associations with the New York Gambino Family.

Coincidentally, Barlow mentions Richard Burton in his book in a scene in which Dakin's barrister asks a female witness if she likes Burton in an effort to sow doubt in the jury's mind about her identification evidence. Though several of the main characters and important situations carry over from the novel, Clement and La Frenais altered the plot considerably.

=== Casting ===
Burton wrote in his diaries that he was approached to make the film in July 1970 by Elliott Kastner, who had produced Where Eagles Dare (1968) with Burton:

It is a racy sadistic London piece about cops and robbers – the kind of 'bang bang – calling all cars' stuff that I've always wanted to do and never have. It could be more than that depending on the director. I play a cockney gangland leader who is very much a mother's boy and takes her to Southend and buys her whelks etc but in the Smoke am a ruthless fiend incarnate but homosexual as well. All ripe stuff.

Burton normally earned $1,000,000 per film but agreed to make Villain for no salary in exchange for a larger percentage of the profits. "These are the times of economies for everyone making pictures," said Burton, "And actually working this way – if you can afford it and don't mind waiting for your money – is far more exciting for the actor. You feel more involved in everything rather than just like an old hired hand."

Burton also said that the producers persuaded him to take the part through "... great American conmanship. One of the producers said to me – 'I bet if I offered you the part of a cockney gangster you'd turn it down, wouldn't you?'. And of course one's immediate response is to say – don't be daft of course I wouldn't – and the next thing you know you've got a script in your hand." Burton admitted that he had always wanted to play a gangster, having long admired Edward G. Robinson, James Cagney and Humphrey Bogart: "I suppose like the fat man who would have loved to be a ballet dancer." During filming, he said: "I usually play kings or princes or types like that ... I've never played a real villain... Interesting type. I'm not sure about this film. We'll see."

Burton's casting was announced in late July 1970. Nat Cohen called it "something of a coup" claiming it was the first movie Burton had made "wholly financed by British money" for some time. Cohen added "If this comes off it will put the British film industry in a better position than it ever has been before."

In 2013, Ian McShane said that he had mixed feelings about playing Burton's bisexual lover. "After kissing me, he's going to beat the hell out of me and it's that kind of relationship – rather hostile. It was very S&M. It wasn't shown in the film. He said to me, 'I'm very glad you're doing this film.' I said, 'So am I Richard.' He said, 'You know why, don't you?' I said, 'Why?' He said, 'You remind me of Elizabeth.' I guess that made the kissing easier."

=== Filming ===
The film started on 14 September 1970 and was shot over ten weeks. Exteriors were shot on location in areas of London (including the Winstanley and York Road Estates), Brighton, Bedford and Bracknell.

== Release ==
=== Box office ===
British exhibitors voted Burton the most popular star at the box office in 1971, although Villain was not listed among the top ten most popular films. On 30 May 1971, Burton wrote in his diary that Villain was "... a goodish film but so far isn't doing very well in the States but has not yet opened in Britain and the Commonwealth where it should do better." On 21 August 1971, he wrote that the film's director was "whassisname" and that he:

Received a cable... from [executive] Nat Cohen saying the notices for [the film]... superb and great boxoffice, and another cable said we expect a million pounds from UK alone. That means about $1/2 m for me if I remember correctly. There is no accounting for differing tastes of Yanks and English critics. Villain was received badly in the US and with rapture in the UK. I know it is cockney and therefore difficult for Yanks to follow but one would have thought the critics to be of sufficiently wide education to take it in their stride. The English critics, after all, are not embarrassed when they see a film made in Brooklynese. Anyway I am so delighted that it is doing well in UK. Otherwise I would have doubted E's and my judgement in such matters. I thought it was good and she said she knew it was good. The American reaction was therefore a surprise.

=== Critical reception ===
The film received generally unfavourable reviews, possibly because it was seen as a veiled portrait of the Kray twins, who had been jailed for life in March 1969.

Monthly Film Bulletin said "After Performance and Get Carter, there appear to be few atrocities left unexplored in the British underworld. But where the latter’s determinedly ‘unsentimental’ approach resulted in an automaton hero and a story-line loose enough to accommodate a maximum number of picturesque deaths in striking locations, Villain’s superficial nastiness (largely a matter of louder and better synchronised punches) conceals a relatively old-fashioned approach to the genre. The story ... is tidily plotted; the locations are functional; the bad characters are human enough to elicit sympathy at their downfall; and the film whirrs smoothly into top gear for its last-ditch climax, complete with curtain line. ("Who are you looking at?"’ yells Burton to the audience as he is led away handcuffed.) ... The performances are uniformly good; the screenplay, by Ian La Frenais and Dick Clement, is witty and laconic; and Michael Tuchner’s direction is thoroughly efficient, with the robbery itself and the bungled getaway brilliantly staged."

Variety wrote "When a film starts with a sequence where the star whips out a razor and uses it on an alleged informer, and very obviously enjoys doing it, there isn’t much chance that the general tone of the film will be a healthy one. Certainly Metro must depend on the action market for recovery of its production costs as serious filmgoers will not buy the sick tale unfolded in Villain." Filmink called it "a gutsy, gripping film with a fearless performance from Burton."

In Wales and Cinema: the First Hundred Years, Peter Waymark described it as a "disappointingly histrionic London gangster movie."

In 2009, Empire named Villain #2 in a poll of the "20 Greatest Gangster Movies You've Never Seen* (*Probably)."
