= Inquisition of Goa =

Portuguese Inquisition in Portuguese India

Goa Inquisition Inquisição de Goa
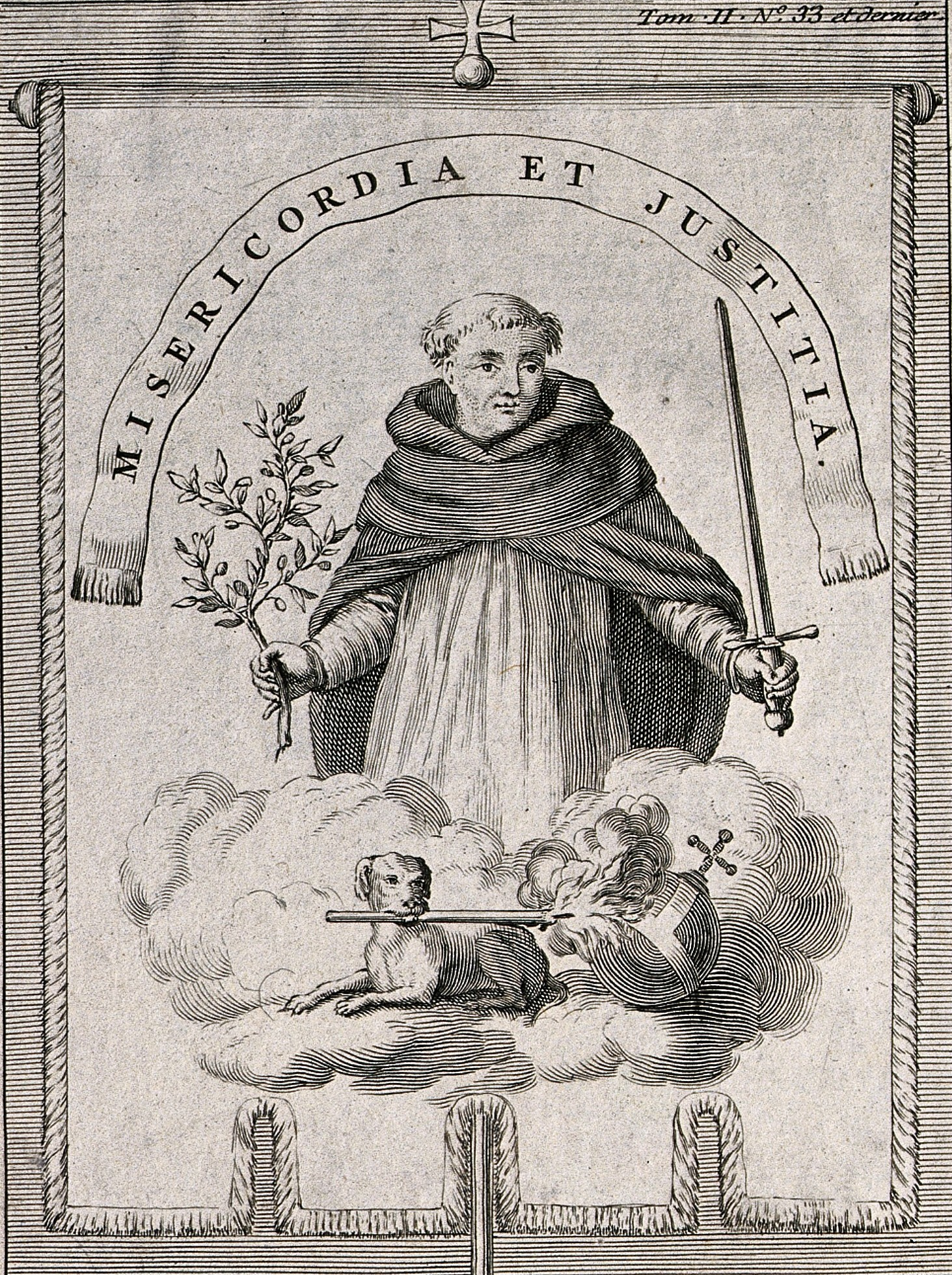
- Seal of the Portuguese Inquisition in Goa

Type
- Type: Part of the Portuguese Inquisition

History
- Established: 1561
- Disbanded: 1812

Meeting place
- Palácio do Sabaio, City of Goa

The Inquisition of Goa (Portuguese: Inquisição de Goa, Portuguese pronunciation: [ĩkizɨˈsɐ̃w dɨ ˈɣoɐ]) was an extension of the Portuguese Inquisition in Portuguese India with its Headquarters at the City of Goa. Its objective was to enforce Catholic orthodoxy and allegiance to the Apostolic See.

The inquisition primarily focused on the New Christians accused of secretly practising their former religions, and Old Christians accused of involvement in the Protestant Reformation of the 16th century. Also among the targets were those suspected of committing sodomy; they were given the second most harsh punishments. The inquisition was established in 1560, briefly stopped from 1774 to 1778, and was reconvened and continued until it was finally abolished in 1812.

Crypto-Hinduism practiced by the Goan Catholics was viewed as a challenge to the Church's doctrine. Those accused of such practices were often instructed to confess and realign with Catholic teachings. Imprisonment, torture, death penalties, and intimidating people into exile were used by the Inquisition to enforce Catholic religious control. The Inquisitors also seized and burned books written in Sanskrit, Dutch, English, or Konkani, as they were suspected of containing teachings that deviated from Catholic doctrine or promoted Protestant, Hindu or Muslim doctrine. The Inquisitors aimed to ensure Catholic teachings were absolutely enforced.

The aims of the Portuguese Empire in Asia were trading spices, spreading Christianity, and suppressing Islam (due to the Al-Andalus Islamic rule of Iberia which lasted 781 years). The Portuguese were motivated by both missionary fervor and economic incentive. Examples of this include the Madura Mission of Roberto de Nobili, the Jesuit mission to the court of the Mughal emperor Akbar, as well as the subjugation of the Malankara Church to the Latin Church at the Synod of Diamper in 1599.

In 1545, Francis Xavier wrote to King John III of Portugal requesting a Goan Inquisition. Between the Inquisition's beginning in 1561 and its temporary abolition in 1774, around 16,000 persons were brought to trial. Portuguese authorities sought to enforce Catholic doctrine in Goa. When the Inquisition ended in 1812, the majority of its records were destroyed by Portuguese officials, making it difficult to determine the exact figures of those prosecuted and the nature of their cases. However, the few records that remain indicate that approximately 57 individuals across the 249 year long inquisition were sentenced to execution for significant religious transgressions, while an additional 64 were symbolically condemned after they had died in custody. These numbers reflect the rarity of such punishments amid efforts to enforce compulsory Catholicism over many decades, partly because people avoided prosecution by fleeing Goa.

From the 1590s onwards, the Goan Inquisition was the most intense, as practices like offerings to local deities were perceived as witchcraft. This became the central focus of the Inquisition in the East in the 17th century.

In Goa, the Inquisition also prosecuted violators observing Hindu or Muslim rituals or festivals, and persons who interfered with Portuguese attempts to convert local Muslims and Hindus. The laws of the Goa Inquisition sought to strengthen the spread of Catholicism in the region by criminalising practices that conflicted with Catholic teachings. In this context, the Inquisition prohibited conversion to Hinduism, Islam, and Judaism, as well as restricted the use of Konkani and Sanskrit, languages associated with Hindu religious practices. These measures were intended to force Catholicism on the local population. Although the Goa Inquisition ended in 1812, discrimination against Hindus under Portuguese rule continued in other forms such as the Xenddi tax implemented from 1705 to 1840, which was similar to the jizya levy.

== Background ==
Illustration of the ruins of the headquarters of the Goa Inquisition, from L'Homme et La Terre by Élisée Reclus (1905)

=== The Inquisition in Portugal ===
Ferdinand and Isabella were married in 1469, thereby uniting the Iberian kingdoms of Aragon and Castile into Spain. In 1492, they expelled the Jewish population of Spain, many of whom then moved to Portugal. Within five years, ideas of anti-Judaism and Inquisition were adopted in Portugal. Instead of another expulsion, the King of Portugal ordered the forced conversion of the Jews in 1497, and these were called New Christians or Crypto-Jews. He stipulated that the validity of their conversions would not be investigated for two decades. In 1506 in Lisbon, there was a massacre of several hundred conversos or marranos, as newly converted Jews or New Christians were called, instigated by the preaching of two Spanish Dominicans. Some persecuted Jews fled Portugal for the New World in the Americas. Others went to Asia as traders, settling in India.

These ideas and the practice of Inquisition on behalf of the Holy Office of Catholic Church was spread by the missionaries and colonial administrators of Portugal to Portuguese colonies such as Estado da India. One of the most notable New Christians was Garcia de Orta, who emigrated to Goa in 1534. He was posthumously convicted of Judaism. The Goa Inquisition enforced by the Portuguese Christians was not unusual, as similar tribunals operated in South American colonies during the same centuries such as the Lima Inquisition and the Brazil Inquisition under the Lisbon tribunal. Like the Goa Inquisition, these tribunals arrested suspects, interrogated and convicted them, and issued punishments for secretly practising religious beliefs different from Christianity.

=== Portuguese arrival and conquest ===
Goa was founded and built by ancient Hindu kingdoms and had served as a capital of the Kadamba dynasty. In the late 13th century, a Muslim invasion led to the plunder of Goa by Malik Kafur on behalf of Alauddin Khilji and an Islamic occupation. In the 14th century, Vijayanagara Hindu rulers conquered and occupied it. It became a part of the Bahmani Sultanate in the 15th century, and thereafter was under the rule of Sultan Adil Shah of Bijapur when Vasco da Gama reached Kozhekode (Calicut) in 1498.

After da Gama's return, Portugal sent an armed fleet to conquer and create a colony in India. In 1510, the Portuguese Admiral Afonso de Albuquerque (c. 1453–1515) launched a series of campaigns to take Goa, wherein the Portuguese ultimately prevailed. The Christian Portuguese were assisted by the Hindu Vijayanagara Empire's regional agent Timmayya in their attempt to capture Goa from the Muslim ruler Adil Shah. Goa became the centre of Portuguese colonial possessions in India and activities in other parts of Asia. It also served as the key and lucrative trading centre between the Portuguese and the Hindu Vijayanagara Empire and Muslim Bijapur Sultanate to its east. Wars continued between the Bijapur Sultanate and the Portuguese forces for decades.

=== Introduction of the Inquisition to India ===
After Vasco da Gama returned to Portugal from his maiden voyage to India, Pope Nicholas V issued the Papal bull Romanus Pontifex. This granted a padroado from the Holy See, giving Portugal the responsibility, monopoly right and patronage for the propagation of the Catholic Christian faith in newly discovered areas, along with exclusive rights to trade in Asia on behalf of the Catholic Empire. From 1515 onwards, Goa served as the centre of missionary efforts under Portugal's royal patronage (Padroado) to expand Catholic Christianity in Asia. (Note: The institution of Padroado dates to the 11th-century. Similarly, Portuguese king's involvement in setting up, financing and militarily supporting Catholic missionaries pre-dated Portuguese Goa by centuries. A number of Vatican bulls were issued to formalize this process before and after Portuguese Goa was established. For example, for the conquest of Ceuta where missionaries sailed with the Portuguese armada, the Inter Caetera bull of 1456, and the much later dated Praeclara Charissimi bull that bestowed upon the Portuguese king the responsibilities of "Grand Master of the military orders of Christ", and others.) Similar padroados were also issued by the Vatican in the favour of Spain and Portugal in South America in the 16th century. The padroado mandated the building of churches and support for Catholic missions and evangelism activities in the new lands, and brought these under the religious jurisdiction of the Vatican. The Jesuits were the most active of the religious orders in Europe that participated under the padroado mandate in the 16th and 17th centuries. (Note: Early texts use the term "the Roman fathers" for Jesuits. The first Jesuits arrived in Goa in 1540.)

The establishment of the Portuguese on the Western coast of India was of particular interest to the New Christians population of Portugal who were suffering harshly under the Portuguese Inquisition. The crypto-Jewish targets of the Inquisition in Portugal began flocking to Goa, and their community reached considerable proportions. India was attractive for Jews who had been forcibly baptized in Portugal for a variety of reasons. One reason was that India was home to ancient, well-established Jewish communities. Jews who had been forcibly converted could approach these communities, and re-join their former faith if they chose to do so, without having to fear for their lives as these areas were beyond the scope of the Inquisition. Another reason was the opportunity to engage in trade (of spices, diamonds, etc.) from which New Christians in Portugal had been restricted at the onset of the Portuguese Inquisition. In his book, The Marrano Factory, Professor Antonio Saraiva of the University of Lisbon details the strength of the New Christians on the economic front by quoting a 1613 document written by attorney, Martin de Zellorigo. Zellorigo writes regarding "the Men of the Nation" (a term used for Jewish New Christians): "For in all of Portugal there is not a single merchant (hombre de negocios) who is not of this Nation. These people have their correspondents in all lands and domains of the king our lord. Those of Lisbon send kinsmen to the East Indies to establish trading-posts where they receive the exports from Portugal, which they barter for merchandise in demand back home. They have outposts in the Indian port cities of Goa and Cochin and in the interior. In Lisbon and in India nobody can handle the trade in merchandise except persons of this Nation. Without them, His Majesty will no longer be able to make a go of his Indian possessions, and will lose the 600,000 ducats a year in duties which finance the whole enterprise – from equipping the ships to paying the seamen and soldiers". The Portuguese reaction to the New Christians in India came in the form of bitter letters of complaint and polemics that were written, and sent to Portugal by secular and ecclesiastical authorities; these complaints were about trade practices, and the abandonment of Catholicism. In particular, the first archbishop of Goa Dom Gaspar de Leao Pereira, was extremely critical of the New Christian presence, and was highly influential in petitioning for the establishment of the Inquisition in Goa.

Portugal also sent missionaries to Goa, and its colonial government supported the Christian mission with incentives for baptizing Hindus and Muslims into Christians. A diocese was established in Goa in 1534. In 1542, Martim Afonso de Sousa was appointed the new Governor of Portuguese India. He arrived in Goa with the Society of Jesus co-founder Francis Xavier. By 1548, the Portuguese colonists had completed fourteen churches in the colony.

The surviving records of missionaries from 16th to 17th century, states Délio de Mendonça, extensively stereotypes and criticizes the gentiles, a term that broadly referred to Hindus. To European missionaries, the Gentiles of India that were not outright hostile were superstitious, weak and greedy. One missionary claimed that Indians converted to Christianity for material benefits such as jobs or clothing gifts; freedom in the case of slaves kept by the Hindus and Muslims; and marriage to Christian women in the case of unmarried non-Christian men. After baptism, these new converts continued to practice their old religion in secret in the manner similar to crypto-Jews who had been forcibly converted to Christianity in Portugal earlier. Jesuit missionaries considered this a threat to the purity of Catholic Christian belief and pressed for Inquisition in order to punish the crypto-Hindus, crypto-Muslims and crypto-Jews, thereby ending the heresy.

The Goa Inquisition adapted the directives issued between 1545 and 1563 by the Council of Trent to Goa and other Indian colonies of Portugal. This included attacking Hindu customs, active preaching to increase the number of Christian converts, fighting enemies of Catholic Christians, uprooting behaviours that were deemed to be heresies and maintaining the purity of Catholic faith. The Portuguese accepted the caste system thereby attracting the elites of the local society, states Mendonça, because Europeans of the sixteenth century had their estate system and held that social divisions and hereditary royalty were divinely established. It was the festivals, syncretic religious practices and other traditional customs that were identified as heresy, relapses and shortcomings of the natives needing a preventative and punitive Inquisition.

=== Controversy regarding Saint Francis Xavier's involvement ===
Saint Francis Xavier led an extensive mission into Asia, mainly the Portuguese Empire in the East, and was influential in evangelisation work, most notably in early modern India. He was extensively involved in the missionary activity in Portuguese India. In 1546, Francis Xavier proposed the establishment of the Goan Inquisition in a letter addressed to the Portuguese King, John III where he wrote

By another route I have written to your highness of the great need there is in India for preachers... The second necessity which obtains in India, if those who live there are to be good Christians, is that your highness should institute the holy Inquisition; for there are many who live according to the law of Moses or the law of Muhammad without any fear of God or shame before men

He furthermore advocated for greater action by the Portuguese governor for the propagation of Christianity in Goa going as far as threatening the official with severe punishment in case of failure:

Let the king warn the governor that] "should he fail to take active steps for the great increase of our faith, you are determined to punish him, and inform him with a solemn oath that, on his return to Portugal, all his property will be forfeited for the benefit of the Santa Misericordia, and beyond this tell him that you will keep him in irons for a number of years ... There is no better way of ensuring that all in India become Christians than that your highness should inflict severe punishment on a governor

The inquisition was declared two decades after he left Goa, and the main laws were implemented in 1567, about 25 years after his departure and 8 years after his death. Around 472 years passed since his death and transfer of relics back to Old Goa.

The letter cited was one written to King John III of Portugal, dated 20 January 1545 (three years after leaving Goa) from Malacca in the Malay archipelago, in response to the scandalous lifestyle of the Portuguese sailors who had made the port city home, where he criticizes John III himself (something very rare at that time) about his officials who only care about collecting taxes and not about maintaining discipline amongst his subjects, and hence asks that a separate official with powers be sent to aid the old bishop to protect the new converts from ill-treatment from the undisciplined Portuguese commandants.

== Launch of the Inquisition in India ==
Even before the Inquisition was launched, the local government in Goa tried persons for religious crimes and punished those convicted, as well as targeted Judaizing. A Portuguese order to destroy Hindu temples along with the seizure of Hindu temple properties and their transfer to the Catholic missionaries is dated 30 June 1541. Prior to authorizing of the Inquisition office in Goa in 1560, King John III of Portugal issued an order, on 8 March 1546, to forbid Hinduism, destroy Hindu temples, prohibit the public celebration of Hindu feasts, expel Hindu priests and severely punish those who created any Hindu images in Portuguese possessions in India.

A special religious tax was imposed before 1550 on Muslim mosques within Portuguese territory. Records suggest that a New Christian was executed by the Portuguese in 1539 for the religious crime of "heretical utterances". A Jewish converso or Christian convert named Jeronimo Dias was garrotted and burnt at the stake in Goa by the Portuguese, for the religious heresy of Judaizing in 1543 before the Goa Inquisition tribunal was formed.

=== The beginning of the Inquisition ===
Cardinal Henrique of Portugal sent Aleixo Díaz Falcão as the first inquisitor and established the first tribunal. The Goa Inquisition office was housed in the former palace of Sultan Adil Shah.

Various orders issued by the Goa Inquisition included:

- All qadis were ordered out of Portuguese territory in 1567;
- Non-Christians were forbidden from occupying any public office, and only a Christian could hold such an office;
- Hindus were forbidden from producing any Christian devotional objects or symbols;
- Hindu children whose father had died were required to be handed over to the Jesuits for conversion to Christianity;
- Hindu women who converted to Christianity could inherit all of the property of their parents;
- Hindu clerks in all village councils were replaced with Christians;
- Christian ganvkars (freeholders) could make village decisions without any Hindu ganvkars present, however Hindu ganvkars could not make any village decisions unless all Christian ganvkars were present; in Goan villages with Christian majorities, Hindus were forbidden from attending village assemblies.
- Christian members were to sign first on any proceedings, Hindus later;
- In legal proceedings, Hindus were unacceptable as witnesses, only statements from Christian witnesses were admissible;
- Hindu temples were demolished in Portuguese Goa, and Hindus were forbidden from building new temples or repairing old ones. A temple demolition squad of Jesuits was formed which actively demolished pre-16th century temples, with a 1569 royal letter recording that all Hindu temples in Portuguese colonies in India have been demolished and burnt down (desfeitos e queimados);
- Hindu priests were forbidden from entering Portuguese Goa to officiate Hindu weddings.

Sephardic Jews living in Goa, many of whom had fled the Iberian Peninsula to escape the excesses of the Spanish Inquisition, were also persecuted in case they, or their ancestors, had fraudulently converted to Christianity. The narrative of Da Fonseca describes the violence and brutality of the inquisition. The records speak of the demand for hundreds of prison cells to accommodate the accused.

According to Benton, between 1561 and 1623, the Goa Inquisition brought 3,800 cases. This was a large number given that the total population of Goa was about 60,000 in the 1580s with an estimated Hindu population then about a third or 20,000.

Seventy-one autos de fé ("act of faith") were recorded, the grand spectacle of public penance often followed by convicted individuals being variously punished up to and including burning at the stake. In the first few years alone, over 4000 people were arrested. According to Machado, in its two-and-a-half centuries of existence in Goa, the Inquisition burnt 57 people to death at the stake and 64 in effigy, of whom 105 were men and 16 were women. The sentence of "burning in effigy" was applied to those convicted in absentia or who had died in prison; in the latter case, their remains were burned in a coffin at the same time as the effigy, which was hung up for public display. Others sentenced to various punishments totalled 4,046, of whom 3,034 were men and 1,012 were women. According to the Chronista de Tissuary (Chronicles of Tiswadi), the last auto de fé was held in Goa on 7 February 1773.

== Implementation and consequences ==
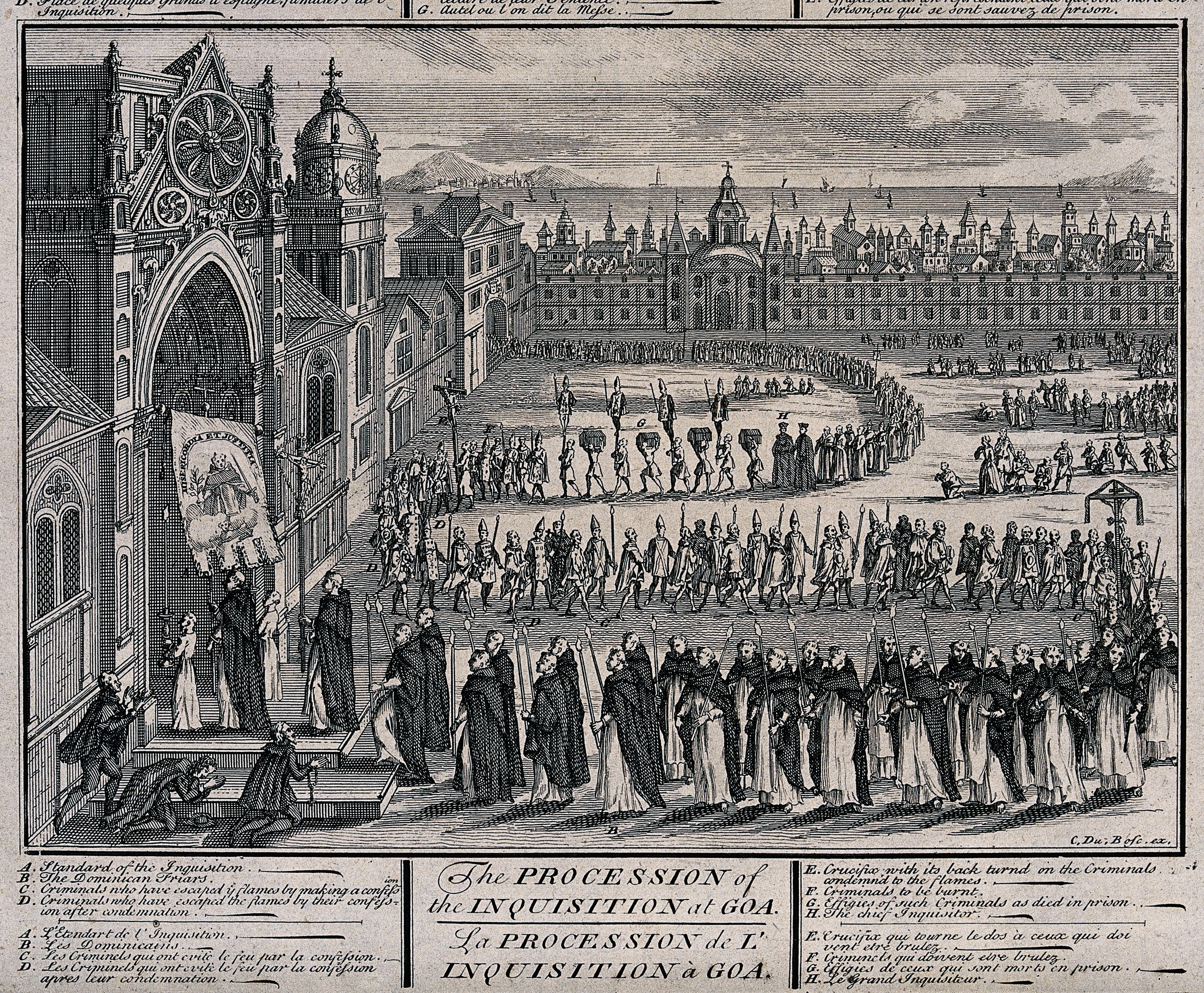
The auto-da-fé procession of the Inquisition at Goa. An annual event to publicly humiliate and punish the heretics, it shows the Chief Inquisitor, Dominican friars, Portuguese soldiers, as well as religious criminals condemned to be burnt in the procession.

An appeal to start the Inquisition in the Indian colonies of Portugal was sent by Vicar General Miguel Vaz. According to Indo-Portuguese historian Teotonio R. de Souza, the original requests targeted the "Moors" (Muslims), New Christian, Jews and those Hindus involved in propagating 'Gentility' and heresy, and it made Goa a centre of persecution operated by the Portuguese.

The colonial administration under demands of the Jesuits and Church Provincial Council of Goa in 1567 enacted anti-Hindu laws to end what the Catholics considered to be heretical conduct and to encourage conversions to Christianity. Laws were passed banning Christians from keeping Hindus in their employ, and the public worship of Hindus was deemed unlawful. Hindus were forced to assemble periodically in churches to listen to the Christian doctrine or to the criticism of their religion. Hindu books in Sanskrit and Marathi were burnt by the Goan Inquisition. It also forbade Hindu priests from entering Goa to officiate Hindu weddings. Violations resulted in various forms of punishment to non-Catholics such as fines, public flogging, banishment to Mozambique, imprisonment, execution, burning at stakes or burning in effigy under the orders of the Christian Portuguese prosecutors at the auto-da-fé.

The inquisition forced Hindus to flee Goa in large numbers and later the migration of its Christians and Muslims, from Goa to the surrounding regions that were not in the control of the Jesuits and Portuguese India. The Hindus responded to the destruction of their temples by recovering the images from the ruins of their older temples and using them to build new temples just outside the borders of the Portuguese controlled territories. In some cases where the Portuguese built churches on the spot the destroyed temples were, Hindus started annual processions that carry their gods and goddesses linking their newer temples to the site where the churches stand, after Portuguese colonial era ended.

=== Persecution of Goan Catholics ===
The Inquisition considered those Hindus who had converted to Catholicism, but continued to observe their former Hindu customs and cultural practices, as heretics. The Catholic missionaries aimed to eradicate indigenous languages such as Konkani and cultural practices such as ceremonies, fasts, growing of the tulsi plant in front of the house, the use of flowers and leaves for ceremony or ornament.

There were other far reaching changes that took place during the Portuguese occupation, these changes included the prohibition of traditional musical instruments and the prohibition of the singing of celebratory verses, which were replaced with Western music.

People were renamed when they converted and they were not permitted to use their original Hindu names. Alcohol was introduced and dietary habits changed dramatically so that foods which were once taboo, such as pork which is shunned by Muslims and beef which is shunned by Hindus, became part of the Goan diet.

Nevertheless, many Goan Catholics continued to observe some of their old cultural practices and Hindu customs. Some of those accused of Crypto-Hinduism were condemned to death. Such circumstances forced many to leave Goa and settle in the neighbouring kingdoms, of which a minority went to the Deccan and the vast majority went to Canara.

The Catholic descendants of Hindus were more likely to be prosecuted, although this could be due to their having been a higher proportion of the population. About 74% of those sentenced were charged with Crypto-Hinduism (practicing Hinduism privately despite being Christian officially), while Crypto-Muslims (practicing Islam privately despite being Christian officially) made up about 1.5% sentenced; 1.5% were tried for obstructing the operations of the Holy Office of the Inquisition. Most records of the nearly 250 years of Inquisition trials were burnt by the Portuguese after the Inquisition had been abolished. Those that have survived, such as those between 1782 and 1800, state that people continued to be tried and punished. A larger proportion of those arrested, tried and sentenced during the Goa Inquisition, according to António José Saraiva, came from the lowest social strata. The trial records suggest that the victims were not exclusively Hindus, but included members of other religions found in India as well as some Europeans.

Historian Severine Silva states that those who fled the Inquisition preferred to observe a mixture of Hindu customs and Catholic practices.

As the persecution increased, missionaries complained that the Bamonns (Brahmins) continued to perform the Hindu religious rites and Hindus defiantly increased their public religious ceremonies. This defiance by the Hindus, alleged the missionaries, motivated the recently converted Goan Catholics to participate in Hindu ceremonies and relapse into Hinduism. In addition, states Délio de Mendonça, there was a hypocritical difference between the preaching and the practices of the Portuguese who were living in Goa. The Portuguese Christians and many clergymen were gambling, spending extravagantly, practicing public concubinage, extorting money from the Indians, and engaging in sodomy and adultery. The "bad examples" of Portuguese Catholics were not universal and there were also "good examples" in which some Portuguese Catholics offered medical care to the Goan Catholics who were sick. However, the "good examples" were not strong enough when they were contrasted with the "bad examples", and the Portuguese betrayed their belief in their cultural superiority and their assumptions that "Hindus, Muslims, barbarians and pagans did not possess virtues and goodness", states Mendonça. Racial epithets such as negros and cachorros (dogs) were commonly used against the natives by the Portuguese.

In the later decades of the 250-year period of the Goa Inquisition, the Portuguese Catholic clergy discriminated against the Indian Catholic clergy because its members were the children of previously converted Catholic parents. The Goan Catholics were referred to as "black priests" and they were also stereotyped as being "ill-natured and ill-behaved by their very nature, lascivious, drunkards, etc. and, based on these stereotypes, they were considered most unworthy to receive the charge of the churches" in Goa. Friars who did not want to lose their careers and promotions alleged that unlike proper Europeans, those who grew up as native Catholics hated "white skinned" people because they were suffering from the "diabolic vice of pride". These racist accusations were used as grounds to keep the parishes and the institution of the clergy in Goa under the monopoly of the Portuguese Catholics rather than allow native Goan Catholics to rise in their ecclesiastical careers based on their merits.

==== Suppression of Konkani ====
In stark contrast to the Portuguese priests' earlier intense study of the Konkani language and its cultivation as a communication medium in their quest for converts during the previous century, under the Inquisition, xenophobic measures were adopted to isolate new converts from the non-Catholic populations. The use of Konkani was suppressed, while the colony suffered from repeated Maratha attempts to invade Goa in the late 17th and early 18th centuries. These events posed a serious threat to Portugal's control of Goa, and they also posed a serious threat to its maintenance of its trade in India. Due to the Maratha threat, Portuguese authorities decided to initiate a positive programme to suppress Konkani in Goa. The use of Portuguese was enforced, and Konkani became a language of marginal peoples.

Urged by the Franciscans, the Portuguese viceroy forbade the use of Konkani on 27 June 1684 and he also decreed that within three years, the local people would generally speak the Portuguese tongue. They would be required to use it in all of their contacts and they would also be required to use it in all contracts which were made in Portuguese territories. The penalty for violations of this law would be imprisonment. The decree was confirmed by the king on 17 March 1687. According to the Inquisitor António Amaral Coutinho's letter to the Portuguese monarch João V in 1731, these draconian measures did not meet with success.^{b} With the fall of the Province of the North (which included Bassein, Chaul and Salsette) to the Marathas in 1739, the Portuguese renewed their assault on Konkani. On 21 November 1745, Archbishop Lourenço de Santa Maria decreed that applicants to the priesthood had to have knowledge of and the ability to speak in Portuguese; this applied not only to the pretendentes, but also for their close relations, as confirmed by rigorous examinations by reverend persons. Furthermore, the Bamonns (Brahmins) and Chardos (Kshatriyas) were required to learn Portuguese within six months, failing which they would be denied the right to marriage. In 1812, the Archbishop decreed that children were to be prohibited from speaking Konkani in schools and in 1847; this ban was extended to seminaries. In 1869, Konkani was completely banned in schools.

As a result, Goans did not develop a literature in Konkani, nor could the language unite the population, because several scripts (including Roman, Devanagari and Kannada) were used to write it. Konkani became the lingua de criados (language of the servants), while the Hindu and Catholic elites turned to Marathi and Portuguese, respectively. Since India liberated Goa in 1961, Konkani has become the cement that binds all Goans across caste, religion and class; it is affectionately termed Konkani Mai (Mother Konkani). The language received full recognition in 1987, when the Indian government recognised Konkani as the official language of Goa.

=== Persecution of St Thomas Christians ===
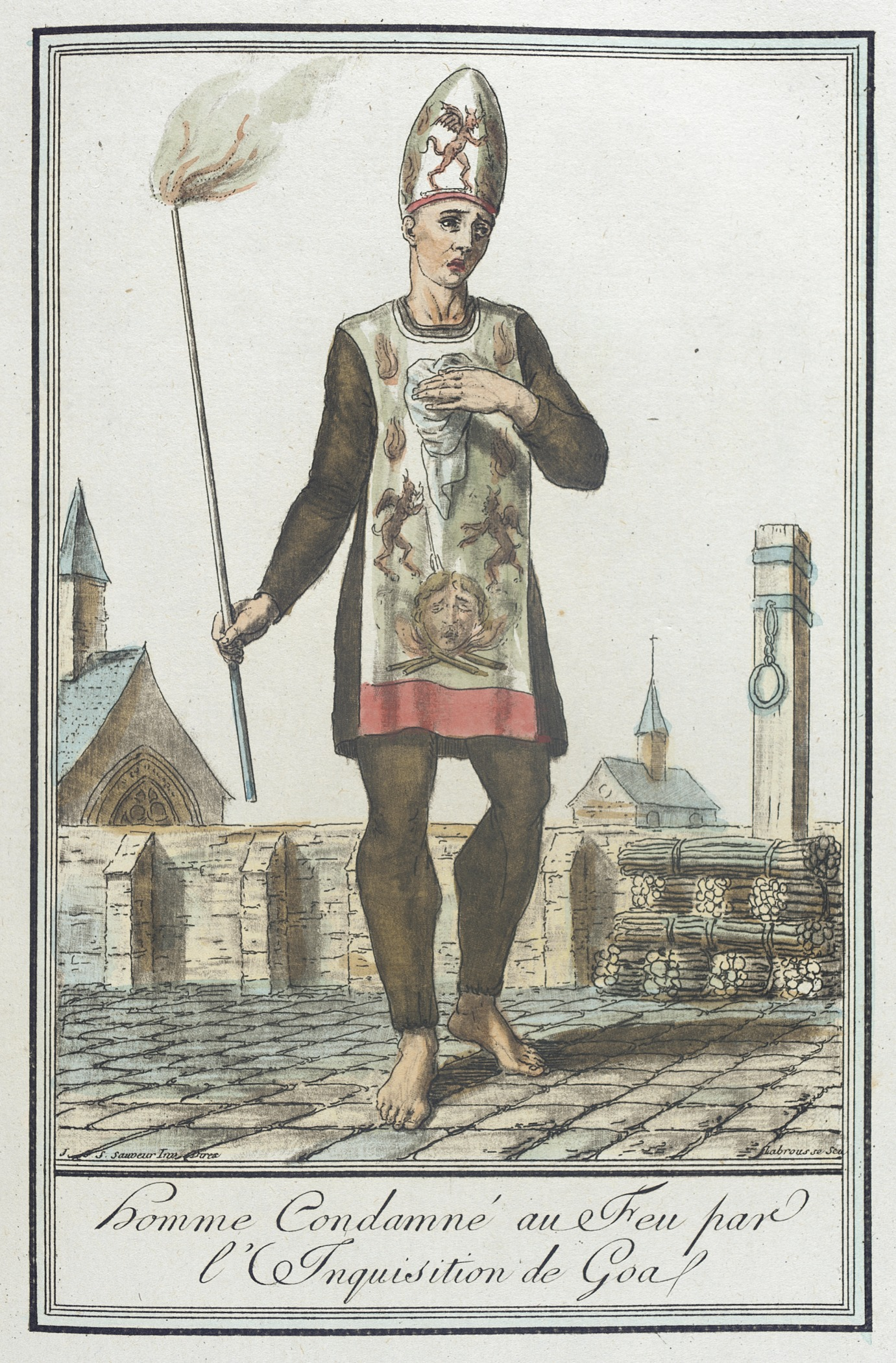
An 18th century French sketch showing a man condemned to be burnt alive by the Goa Inquisition. The stake is behind him to his left, the punishment is sketched on his shirt. It was inspired by Charles Dellon's persecution.

In 1599 under Aleixo de Menezes, the Synod of Diamper forcefully converted the East Syriac Saint Thomas Christians (also known as Syrian Christians or Nasranis) of Kerala to the Catholic Church. He stated that they needed to be converted to Catholicism because they were practicing Nestorianism, a Christological position which was declared heretical by the Council of Ephesus. The synod imposed severe restrictions on their practice of their faith and it also imposed severe restrictions on their practice of using Syriac/Aramaic. They were politically disfranchised and their Metropolitanate status was discontinued by the blocking of bishops from the East. The persecution continued to operate on a large scale until it was ended by the Coonan Cross oath rebellion and the Nasrani rebellion in 1653, the eventual capture of Fort Kochi by the Dutch in 1663, and the resulting expulsion of the Portuguese from Malabar. By the time the persecution ended, St Thomas Christians were divided into opposing camps and their historical records were obliterated. Even the common prayer book was not spared by the Portuguese. This resulted in the valuable Historical records of the St Thomas Christians being lost and the beginning of division amongst a once prosperous community.

=== Persecution of non-Portuguese Catholic Christians ===
The Goa Inquisition also persecuted non-Portuguese Christian missionaries and physicians, such as those missionaries and physicians who were from France. In the 16th century, the Portuguese clergy became jealous of a French priest who was operating in Madras (now Chennai); they lured him to Goa, then they had him arrested and sent to the inquisition. The French priest was saved when the Hindu King of a Karnataka kingdom interceded on his behalf by laying siege to St. Thome until the priest was released. Charles Dellon, the 18th-century French physician, was another Christian who was arrested and tortured by the Goa Inquisition because he questioned Portuguese missionary practices in India. For five years, Dellon was imprisoned by the Goa Inquisition and he was not released until France demanded it. Dellon described, states Klaus Klostermaier, the horrors of life and death at the Catholic Palace of the Inquisition that managed the prison and deployed a rich assortment of torture instruments per recommendations of the Church tribunals.

There were assassination attempts against Archdeacon George, so as to subjugate the entire Church under Rome. The common prayer book was not spared. Books were burnt and any priest who was professing independence was imprisoned. Some altars were pulled down to make way for altars which were conforming to Catholic criteria.

=== Persecution of Hindus ===
Hindus could be arrested for attempting to dissuade countrymen for converting to Christianity, abetting Goan Christians fleeing Goa, or hiding abandoned/orphaned children who had not been reported to the authorities.

Victims of the Goa Inquisition (1782–1800 trials) (Note: The per cent data includes those charged with crypto-Hinduism and where the caste is identified. For about 50% of the victims, this data is unavailable.)
Social group	Per cent
Non Brahmins	18.5%
Curumbins (tribal-untouchables)	17.5%
Chardos (warriors)	7%
Brahmins	5%

Fr. Diogo da Borba and his advisor Vicar General Miguel Vaz followed the missionary goals to convert the Hindus. In cooperation with the Jesuit and Franciscan missionaries, the Portuguese administration in Goa and military were deployed to destroy the cultural and institutional roots of Hindus and other Indian religions. For example, Viceroy and Captain General António de Noronha and, later Captain General Constantino de Sa de Noronha, systematically destroyed Hindu and Buddhist temples in Portuguese possessions and during attempted new conquests on the Indian subcontinent.

Exact data on the nature and number of Hindu temples destroyed by the Christian missionaries and Portuguese government are unavailable. Some 160 temples were razed to the ground on the Goa island by 1566. Between 1566 and 1567, a campaign by Franciscan missionaries destroyed another 300 Hindu temples in Bardez (North Goa). In Salcete (South Goa), approximately another 300 Hindu temples were destroyed by the Christian officials of the Inquisition although having conflicting evidence. Numerous Hindu temples were destroyed elsewhere at Assolna and Cuncolim by Portuguese authorities. A 1569 royal letter in Portuguese archives records that all Hindu temples in its colonies in India had been burnt and razed to the ground.

According to Ulrich Lehner, "Goa had been a tolerant place in the sixteenth century, but the Goan Inquisition had turned it into a hostile location for Hindus and members of other Asian religions. Temples had been razed, public Hindu rituals forbidden, and conversions to Hinduism severely punished. The Goa Inquisition prosecuted harshly any cases of public Hindu worship; over three-quarters of its cases pertained to this, and only two percent to apostasy or heresy."

New laws promulgated between 1566 and 1576 prohibited Hindus from repairing any damaged temples or constructing new ones. Ceremonies including public Hindu weddings were banned. Anyone who owned an image of a Hindu god or goddess was deemed a criminal. Non-Hindus in Goa were encouraged to identify and report anyone who owned images of god or goddess to the Inquisition authorities. Those accused were searched and if any evidence was found, such "idol owning" Hindus were arrested and they lost their property. Half of the seized property went as reward to the accusers, the other half to the church.

In 1620, an order was passed to prohibit Hindus from performing their marriage rituals. An order was issued in June 1684 for suppressing the Konkani language and making it compulsory to speak Portuguese. The law provided for dealing harshly with anyone using the local languages. Following that law, all non-Catholic cultural symbols and books written in local languages were to be destroyed. The French physician Charles Dellon experienced first-hand the cruelty of the Inquisition's agents, and complained about the goals, arbitrariness, torture and racial discrimination against the people of Indian origin, particularly Hindus. He was arrested, served a prison sentence where he witnessed the torture and starvation Hindus were put through, and was released under the pressure of the French government. He returned to France and published a book in 1687 describing his experiences in Goa as Relation de l'Inquisition de Goa (Relation of the Inquisition of Goa).

=== Persecution of Buddhists ===
Many of the atrocities committed by the Portuguese against Buddhists in South Asia took place in present-day Sri Lanka, which had maintained a Buddhist majority since around the 3rd century BC. The Portuguese first established trading relations with the coastal Kingdom of Kotte in 1505, but later expanded their authority over much of coastal Sri Lanka, taking control of the former territories of the Kingdoms of Kotte and Jaffna. From 1597 until 1658 these areas were incorporated as Portuguese Ceylon, becoming part of the Portuguese Estado da Índia.

One example of Buddhist persecution during the Inquisition was the alleged destruction of the Buddha's tooth relic in Sri Lanka in 1560. The tooth relic considered as the most revered object of veneration among Buddhists in Sri Lanka, cherished as a sacred cetiya relic of the Buddha. According to Portuguese historians Diogo de Couto and João de Barros, the relic was seized during the 1560 Portuguese expedition of the Jaffna Kingdom and later taken to Goa, where it was destroyed on the orders of the Viceroy of Goa, Don Constantino de Braganza. Prior to its capture, the relic had been safeguarded in the Jaffna Kingdom following the fall of Prince Veediye Bandara, the Commander-in-Chief of the Kingdom of Kotte, in Nallur.

=== Persecution of Jews ===
Goa was a sanctuary for Jews who had been forcibly converted to Christianity on the Iberian peninsula. These forcibly baptized converts were known as New Christians. They lived in what then came to be known as the Jew street. The New Christian population was so substantial that, as Savaira reveals, "in a letter which is dated Almeirim, 18 February 1519, King Manuel I promoted legislation henceforth prohibiting the naming of New Christians to the position of judge, town councillor or municipal registrar in Goa, stipulating, however, that those already appointed were not to be dismissed. This shows that even during the first nine years of Portuguese rule, Goa had a considerable influx of recently baptized Spanish and Portuguese Jews." However, after the start of the Goa Inquisition, Viceroy Dom Antão de Noronha, in December 1565, issued an order that banned Jews from entering the Portuguese territories in India with violators liable to the penalties of arrest, seizure of their property and confinement in a prison. The Portuguese built city fortification walls between 1564 and 1568. It ran adjacent to the Jew street, but placed it outside of the fort.

The Inquisition originally targeted New Christians, that is Jews who had been force-converted to Christianity and who migrated from Portugal to India between 1505 and 1560. Later it added in Moors, a term that meant Muslims who had previously invaded the Iberian peninsula from Morocco. In Goa, the Inquisition included Jews, Muslims and later predominantly Hindus.

A documented case of the persecution of the Jews (New Christians) that began few years before the inauguration of the Goa Inquisition was that of a Goan woman named Caldeira. Her trial contributed to formal launch of Goa Inquisition office.

Caldeira, and 19 other New Christians, were arrested by the Portuguese and brought before the tribunal in 1557. They were charged with Judaizing, visiting synagogues and eating unleavened bread. She was also accused of celebrating Purim festival coincident with the Hindu festival of Holi, wherein she was alleged to have burnt dolls symbolic of "filho de hamam" (son of Haman). Ultimately, all of them were sent from Goa to Lisbon to be tried by the Portuguese Inquisition. There, she was sentenced to death.

The persecution of Jews extended to Portuguese territorial claims in Cochin. Their Synagogue (the Pardesi Synagogue) was destroyed by the Portuguese. The Kerala Jews rebuilt the Paradesi synagogue in 1568.

== In literature ==
- The Goa Inquisition is a book published by Mumbai University Press and authored by Anant Priolkar. It is a narrative of the Goan Inquisition organised by the Portuguese rulers of Goa.
- American poet Lydia Sigourney included the poem "The Destruction of the Inquisition in Goa" in her Moral Pieces in Prose and Verse of 1815.
- Bengali writer Avik Sarkar wrote a novel, Ebong Inquisition in 2017, which stands on the backdrop of the massacre of Hindus in Goa.

== See also ==
- Ad extirpanda
- Auto-da-fé
- Cuncolim Massacre
- Galileo affair
- Mortara case
- Marrano
- History of Goa
- History of the Jews in India
- Christianity in India
- Christianity in Goa
- Christianization of Goa

== Notes ==
a The papal bull Licet ab initio proclaimed an Apostolic constitution on 21 July 1542.
b In his 1731 letter to King João V, the Inquisitor António Amaral Coutinho states:

The first and the principal cause of such a lamentable ruin (perdition of souls) is the disregard of the law of His Majesty, Dom Sebastião of glorious memory, and the Goan Councils, prohibiting the natives to converse in their own vernacular and making obligatory the use of the Portuguese language: this disregard in observing the law, gave rise to so many and so great evils, to the extent of effecting irreparable harm to souls, as well as to the royal revenues. Since i have been though unworthy, the Inquisitor of this State, ruin has set in the villages of Nadorá (sic), Revorá, Pirná, Assonorá and Aldoná in the Province of Bardez; in the villages of Cuncolim, Assolná, Dicarpalli, Consuá and Aquem in Salcette; and in the island of Goa, in Bambolim, Curcá, and Siridão, and presently in the village of Bastorá in Bardez. In these places, some members of village communities, as also women and children have been arrested and others accused of malpractices; for since they cannot speak any other language but their own vernacular, they are secretly visited by botos, servants and high priests of pagodas who teach them the tenets of their sects and further persuade them to offer alms to the pagodas and to supply other necessary requisites for the ornament of the same temples, reminding them of the good fortune their ancestors had enjoyed from such observances and the ruin they were subjected to, for having failed to observe these customs; under such persuasion they are moved to offer gifts and sacrifices and perform other diabolical ceremonies, forgetting the law of Jesus Christ which they had professed in the sacrament of Holy Baptism. This would not have happened had they known only the Portuguese language; since they being ignorant of the native tongue the botos, grous (gurus) and their attendants would not have been able to have any communication with them, for the simple reason that the latter could only converse in the vernacular of the place. Thus an end would have been put to the great loss among native Christians whose faith has not been well grounded, and who easily yield to the teaching of the Hindu priests.
