= The Day of the Sardine =

1961 novel by Sid Chaplin

The Day of The Sardine
- First edition
- Author: Sid Chaplin
- Language: English
- Publisher: Eyre & Spottiswoode
- Publication date: 1961
- Publication place: United Kingdom
- Media type: Print (Hardback)

The Day of The Sardine is a novel by the British writer Sid Chaplin. First published in 1961, it is set in a working-class community in Newcastle upon Tyne at the very beginning of the 1960s.

== Plot ==
The principal character of the novel is Arthur Haggerston, an intelligent but rebellious teenager who lives with his mother, Peg, and her lover, Harry Parker, a former seaman who works in a sardine-canning factory. Arthur leaves school without qualifications and takes up various menial jobs before using the influence of his Uncle George to obtain work installing sewage pipes for the local council. He conducts an affair with Stella, a married woman with a seafaring husband, and develops a friendship with another teenager, Nosey (or Stanley) Carron.

After several altercations with a gang led by Mick Kelly, Arthur and Nosey form their own gang, while Nosey begins a relationship with Kelly's sister, Teresa. The violence between the two gangs escalates, which makes Arthur uneasy. After a fight between the gangs, Arthur is pursued by the police and hides in a church hall where a service is being conducted. He makes the acquaintance of the Pastor, Mr Johnson, and of Johnson's daughter, Dorothy. In a spirit of reconciliation, Arthur attends an open-air brass band concert with Harry and Peg, but Peg spots Arthur's estranged father playing with a military band. Arthur's father is confronted, confesses to bigamy and agrees to a divorce, even if it means that he will face prison.

Nosey claims that Kelly has beaten Teresa, and persuades Arthur to help him exact revenge. In the ensuing fight, Arthur severely injures Kelly, and later hears that Kelly's father has alerted the police. Afterwards, Nosey and Arthur decide to spy on Nosey's brother Crab, who has been conducting an affair with Mildred, the daughter of Charlie Nettlefold, a local scrap-dealer. They witness Crab leaving the scrapyard, and discover that Crab has shot the couple.

After rumours of Arthur's involvement in Kelly's beating spread, he is fired from his job, after which he traps the foreman, Sproggett, and Uncle George in a large pipe, forcing them to dig their way out. Believing that the police will be searching for him in connection with the shooting, Arthur flees, and sends a night sleeping rough in the countryside. He returns to Newcastle and visits Stella, who tells him that she will be moving with her husband to another part of the country. He returns home, to find that Kelly's father did not contact the police, and that Crab Carron has been arrested for the shooting, in which Mildred died but Charlie survived to testify against Crab.

Distraught by Crab's arrest, Nosey tells Arthur that he seduced Dorothy after telling her about Arthur's relationship with Stella. Some time after Crab's execution, Arthur discovers that Nosey has converted to Christianity and has begun preaching for Pastor Johnson's church. Arthur accepts Harry's marriage to Peg, and accepts a job at the sardine-canning factory.
