= The Burden of Proof (Barlow novel) =

1968 novel

- First edition (UK)
- Author: James Barlow
- Language: English
- Genre: Crime
- Publisher: Hamish Hamilton (UK); Simon and Schuster (US)
- Publication date: 1968
- Publication place: United Kingdom
- Media type: Print
- Pages: 258

The Burden of Proof is a 1968 crime novel by the British writer James Barlow.

== Synopsis ==
Vic Dakin, a crime lord with a vast empire across London takes place on a raid on a wages van that goes wrong. Needing an alibi he arranges to blackmail a corrupt MP with evidence of his sexual wrongdoing to give perjured testimony in court. However, the police are doggedly on Dakin's trail.

== Reception ==
The Daily Telegraph praised "a remarkably taut, fast moving narrative".

The Chicago Tribune called it a "sizzling, compelling book."

== Adaptation ==
In 1971, it was adapted into the British film Villain directed by Michael Tuchner and starring Richard Burton, Ian McShane and Nigel Davenport. As a tie-in with the film, the novel was reissued with the alternative title Villain.

== Bibliography ==
- Clinton, Franz Anthony. British Thrillers, 1950-1979: 845 Films of Suspense, Mystery, Murder and Espionage. McFarland, 2020.
- Goble, Alan. The Complete Index to Literary Sources in Film. Walter de Gruyter, 1999.
- Turner, Alwyn W. Crisis? What Crisis?: Britain in the 1970s. Aurum, 2009.
