= Term of Trial =

1962 British film by Peter Glenville

- Directed by: Peter Glenville
- Written by: Peter Glenville
- Based on: Term of Trial; 1961 novel by James Barlow
- Produced by: James Woolf
- Starring: Laurence Olivier; Simone Signoret; Sarah Miles; Hugh Griffith; Terence Stamp
- Cinematography: Oswald Morris
- Edited by: Jim Clark
- Music by: Jean-Michel Damase
- Production company: Romulus Films
- Distributed by: Warner-Pathé (UK); Warner Bros. Pictures (US)
- Release dates: 16 August 1962 (London); 30 January 1963 (New York City)
- Running time: 130 minutes
- Country: United Kingdom
- Language: English

Term of Trial is a 1962 British drama film written and directed by Peter Glenville and starring Laurence Olivier, Simone Signoret, Sarah Miles, Terence Stamp, Hugh Griffith, Roland Culver, Dudley Foster and Thora Hird. It was produced by James Woolf for Romulus Films, with James H. Ware as associate producer. The screenplay was based on the 1961 novel of the same name by James Barlow. The music score was by Jean-Michel Damase and the cinematography by Oswald Morris.

The film marked the screen debut of Miles.

The film had its world premiere on 16 August 1962 at the Warner Theatre in London's West End.

== Plot ==
Graham Weir is a schoolteacher whose criminal record for refusing to fight during World War II has prevented him from progressing in his teaching career. Now, years later, he is married to an embittered woman, and he is a teacher in a school with many disaffected pupils. His sincere interest in his pupils' progress leads him to get involved in their personal situations. His particular attention to Shirley Taylor, a pupil who develops a crush on him, leads him into serious trouble.

== Cast ==
- Laurence Olivier as Graham Weir
- Simone Signoret as Anna
- Sarah Miles as Shirley Taylor
- Terence Stamp as Mitchell
- Hugh Griffith as O'Hara
- Roland Culver as Trowman
- Dudley Foster as Detective Sergeant Keirnan
- Frank Pettingell as Ferguson
- Thora Hird as Mrs. Taylor
- Norman Bird as Mr. Taylor
- Allan Cuthbertson as Sylvan-Jones
- Barbara Ferris as Joan
- Rosamund Greenwood as Constance
- Nicholas Hannen as magistrate
- Derren Nesbitt as lodger

== Production ==
The ingenue part was offered to Hayley Mills whose parents refused to let her do it.

== Critical reception ==
The Monthly Film Bulletin wrote: "Despite Olivier and Signoret's acting, Oswald Morris's usual fine photography, a strong basic story, and smooth direction, this tragedy of good intentions and false accusations falls far short of harrowing or discomfiting. ... Olivier underplays his way into the part of Weir much more naturally and convincingly than in his lauded stage role as the similarly ineffectual anti-hero of Ionesco's Rhinoceros. ... The meetings between Weir and the schoolgirl are all tactfully handled, with Sarah Miles making a pleasing debut as the knowing sensual innocent. The twistedly happy ending for Weir, however, suggests the unattractive moral that only by joining in the rat-race of deception and aping the unscrupulous methods of a commercial culture that exploits the prurient British attitude to sex, can the little man like him survive. A sharper narrative, less heavily loaded against its high-minded protagonist, might have made the condemnation of this perversion of values more obvious, and indeed the whole tale more credible."

The Radio Times Guide to Films gave the film 4/5 stars, writing: "Made at the height of the "kitchen sink" boom in British cinema, this rather neglected drama boasts one of Laurence Olivier's most uncharacteristic and underrated performances. As the teacher at an inner-city school who is looked down upon by everyone from his blowsy wife Simone Signoret to class bully Terence Stamp, he conveys a sense of both seedy decency and wounded resignation that makes his prosecution for molestation and persecution by Signoret all the more painful to endure. In her screen debut, Sarah Miles is superb as the scorned teenager and Thora Hird bristles with indignation as her grasping mother."

British film critic Leslie Halliwell said: "Rather flabby 'adult' drama, too schematic to be really interesting, despite the best that acting can do."
