= Edward Knight (composer) =

American composer (born 1961)

Edward Knight

Edward Knight (born November 4, 1961) is an American composer. His work eschews easy classification, moving freely between jazz, theatrical and concert worlds.

== Background ==
Knight was born in Ann Arbor, Michigan, and was introduced to music by his grandmother, Kathryn Dyer Knight, a concert pianist who taught piano later in life. He excelled at trumpet; as a teenager, he toured three summers with Musical Youth International, performing in Russia, Scandinavia, the British Isles, and several European capitals.

Knight earned his undergraduate degree from Eastern Michigan University and his master's and doctorate in composition from University of Texas at Austin. He spent a year studying privately with John Corigliano in New York, and won a Rotary Scholarship for post-doctoral study at London's Royal College of Music, where he studied with John Lambert. At the Royal College, he became the first American to win the Arthur Bliss Memorial for outstanding postgraduate composer.

== Early orchestral works ==
Knight came to national attention with four large-scale orchestral works in the late 1980s and early 1990s: Of Perpetual Solace, Total Eclipse, Granite Island, and Big Shoulders.

=== Of Perpetual Solace ===
Knight's doctoral work for University of Texas, premiered by the Civic Orchestra of Chicago, Orchestra Hall, Chicago, July 30, 1989. The 14-minute piece won first prize in the National Orchestra Association's New Music Orchestral Project.

=== Total Eclipse ===
The 11-minute piece was selected for the New York Philharmonic's Horizons '90: New Music for Orchestra concert, by a committee headed by Lawrence Leighton Smith and David Del Tredici.

=== Big Shoulders ===
The 1994 winner of ASCAP's Rudolf Nissim Prize for best new orchestral work, Big Shoulders was commissioned by ASCAP/Meet the Composer and the Chicago Symphony Orchestra to commemorate the CSO's centennial. John von Rhein of the Chicago Tribune called the 10-minute piece "visceral in its excitement" and noted: "Knight appears to know his way around the Windy City, for his score persuasively catches our town's jumpy, clashing cadences. Pathetic, mewling glissandi make an amusing leitmotif, and long strings of tremolos entwine boldly colored block sonorities. The score seizes and holds your imagination and makes you want to hear it again." The Kyiv Philharmonic recorded Big Shoulders for volume seven of ERMMedia's “Masterworks of the New Era.”

=== Granite Island ===
The work was commissioned for the first L.A. Composers Project, a competition established to celebrate the Los Angeles Philharmonic Institute's 10th season, and premiered in the Hollywood Bowl in August 1991. The piece was inspired by an abandoned lighthouse set atop a jagged granite island in Lake Superior. Critic Timothy Mangan of the Los Angeles Times noted: "Its originality stems form the composer's canny combination of steady meter with atonal lyricism, a waltz-like lilt with expressionist angst; as such, it sounds like Schoenberg's 'La Valse'. Its 12 minutes pass quickly and, on first hearing, seem tightly unified, suave and sinister, confidently orchestrated and worth another hearing."

== Other New York premieres ==
During the same era, while living in London and New York, Knight also premiered “O Vos Omnes,” performed by I Cantori di New York in Weill Recital Hall at Carnegie Hall Feb. 11, 1989. The premiere of his Concerto for Clarinet and Chamber Ensemble was given by the New York Chamber Ensemble in Florence Gould Hall with soloist Alan Kay. Reviewing the concert, Bernard Holland of The New York Times called Knight a "fresh, original voice" with "an inventive sense of humor." Knight worked as a visiting assistant professor at Hunter College, City University of New York, from 1992-94 before relocating with his family to Vermont.

== First song cycle ==
A commission from the American Music Festival for a 15-minute work for soprano and orchestra inspired Knight to compose his first song cycle, “Life Is Fine.” Knight's setting of six Langston Hughes poems was premiered by the American Music Festival Orchestra. Wayne Lee Gay of Knight-Ridder News Service called the work “inventive and melodic…an eclectic, lyrical orchestral song cycle.” Gay wrote: “Life is Fine has the sound of a work that may well be a major addition to the American vocal-orchestral repertoire.”

The work won first prize in the San Francisco Song Festival's American Art Song Competition and became the centerpiece of Knight's first commercial solo CD, Where the Sunsets Bleed: The Chamber Music of Edward Knight, released by Albany Records and featuring soprano Marquita Lister. In reviewing the release, The American Record Guide called Knight “a storyteller by inclination,” and noted his “witty, in-your-face stuff sung with flair by Lister.” At the work's West Coast premiere, the San Francisco Classical Voice review noted a "Debussyan longing," noting: "The piece exhibited a remarkable expressive range, with each song in the cycle deploying a different musical strategy to match each poem's mood, from dreamlike to jazzy to sarcastic. Soprano Marnie Breckenridge's vitality brought the piece to life...she delivered the scat-like cadenza with perfectly nuanced blue notes and a wonderful sensitivity to expressive timing."

== Oklahoma ==
Mark Parker, conductor of the American Festival Orchestra and dean of the Bass School of Music at Oklahoma City University, recruited Knight to join the OCU faculty as director of music composition and composer-in-residence in 1997. The school is home to the Oklahoma Opera and Music Theater Company, and alma mater to musicians including Mason Williams, Kristin Chenoweth, Kelli O’Hara, Chris Merritt, Leona Mitchell and Sarah Coburn. His Oklahoma surroundings are reflected in several Knight works, including a Route 66 trilogy and a work commissioned and premiered by Brightmusic chamber ensemble: “Beneath A Cinnamon Moon,” a 23-minute trio for clarinet, viola and piano performed at the OK Mozart Festival by Chad Burrow, Paul Neubauer and Amy I-Lin Cheng.

The vocal talent at the school prompted Knight to create art songs, an additional song cycle, and two full-length musicals. He primarily worked with M.J. Alexander, his wife and librettist. Alexander wrote the book and lyrics, and Knight the score, for the 90-minute one-act romantic musical comedy Strike A Match in 1999, for piano and six voices. The work set attendance records and was noted for its “jazzy, bluesy undertones that blur the lines separating opera, music theater and song cycle." Its success led to a commission by the music school for a fully orchestrated work to mark the 50th anniversary of the school's Oklahoma Opera and Music Theater Company. After a 30-week workshop, Night of the Comets premiered in September 2001, in the wake of the 9/11 attacks on the World Trade Center. The musical produced several stand-alone songs, an orchestral suite, and chamber works.

== Twenty-first century ==
After composing for the stage, Knight's chamber compositions became infused with theatrical flare and heightened interaction between players. A review of a Knight work premiered at the International Trumpet Guild Festival in 2006, noted:

Edward Knight's Sonata through Salt-Rimmed Glasses tells a story of romantic hopes raised and dashed in a cantina as an evening progresses. [Trumpeter Michael] Anderson, and pianist Rebecca Wilt, gave a remarkable performance of this work, moving seamlessly between impressive all-out trumpet sonata work and something verging dangerously close to musical comedy as the protagonists worked out their tensions across a seemingly smoldering piano. This work is really a very intense and complex piece and tests the trumpet player to the limit.…The third movement in particular is wonderful, starting with a beautiful and lyrical muted tune played passionately and with supreme control by Anderson - but it all gets a bit unstructured as the night goes on and the melody comes back in a variety of guises, some distorted, others maudlin or angry, moving toward a slow tango which pretty much explodes with passion. This is a witty and novel piece.”

Knight's musical output at OCU is prolific. A 2009 release notes five premieres of commissioned works in six months, spread over four states. He toured China with the Oklahoma City University Symphony Orchestra as it performed a program of American music including his work and compositions from his students.

=== Second song cycle ===
His next song cycle, Tales Not Told, was based on Alexander's historically based poems exploring the lives of six American women: Helen Harvey Tiffany Paddock, Patience Brewster, Keziah Keyes Ransom, Sarah Town Bridges Cloyce, Bessie Barton Paddock, and Mary Dyer. The resulting 16-minute song cycle was premiered by mezzo-soprano Catherine McDaniel in 2007 at University of Oklahoma.

Scholar Judith Carmen called Tales Not Told an “intriguing, heartfelt and beautifully crafted cycle” suited to “Knight’s compositional style with its rhythmic vitality, melodiousness, jazz elements, and slightly askew tonalities.” Carmen commented on the origins of the piece: "The story of the song cycle itself is fascinating. The six women are all direct ancestors of the composer on his paternal grandmother’s side, and the poet, Knight’s wife, researched the histories of the women and wrote the poems that Knight set to music for their children…The direct lineage makes the composer truly an “Ur-American” composer. Knight is quite sensitive both to meaning and imagery in the text of these songs. He captures exactly the right atmosphere and overall motion of each poem as well as many details of imagery in his music."

=== Project 21 ===
Upon his arrival at OCU, Knight founded Project 21: Music for the 21st Century, a forum for composers and new music. Knight and Project 21 hosted the 2009 Society of Composers, Inc., Region VI Conference As of 2010, Project 21 has premiered more than 500 student-created works

Graduates of Knight's studio have been accepted to the composition programs at Juilliard, Yale University, Manhattan School of Music, New England Conservatory, University of Southern California's Scoring for Motion Pictures and Television Program, New York University's Graduate Musical Theater Writing Program at Tisch School for the Arts, San Francisco Conservatory, Cal Arts, University of Texas at Austin, University of California at Santa Barbara, University of Arizona, Bowling Green State University, University of Louisville, the Conservatory of Music at University of Missouri-Kansas City, Florida State University, University of Oklahoma, and London's Royal College of Music. Alumni of Knight's studio include Jay Wadley, Rick McKee, Maya Raviv and Katarzyna Brochocka.

In 2010, he was appointed to the summer composition faculty of Interlochen Center for the Arts, near Traverse City, Michigan.

== Recognition ==
In addition to the Sir Arthur Bliss Award from London's Royal College of Music and ASCAP's Rudolf Nissim Award for best new orchestral work, Knight has won the San Francisco Song Festival's American Art Song Competition, the Delius Composition Competition, Bergen Festival's Morton Gould Memorial, and Vienna Modern Masters. He was named Oklahoma's Musician of the Year in 2002, and cited in commendations from the Oklahoma House of Representatives and State Senate. He is a 2009 Djerassi fellow, a 2008 Ucross Foundation fellow, a 2007 winner of the Aaron Copland Award, and a past fellow at the Yaddo and MacDowell artist colonies.

== Discography ==
Five commercial CDs feature Knight's work, including recordings from ERMMedia and Capstone Records and a solo CD released by Albany Records:

- Where the Sunsets Bleed: Chamber Music of Edward Knight, Albany Records, 2005
- Melange: New Music for Piano, Capstone Records, 2005
- Masterworks of the NewEra, Volume 7, Kyiv Philharmonic, ERMMedia, 2005
- Holidays of the New Era, Volume 1, Kyiv Philharmonic and Chamber Choir Kyiv, ERMMedia, 2006
- Holidays of the New Era, Volume 2, Prague Radio Symphony and Kuhn Choir, ERMMedia, 2008
