= Man and Power =

1961 science book for children by L. Sprague de Camp

Man And Power
- Cover of Man And Power
- Author: L. Sprague de Camp
- Illustrator: Russ Kinne, Roman Vishniac, Alton S. Tobey and others
- Language: English
- Subject: Engineering
- Publisher: Golden Press
- Publication date: 1961
- Publication place: United States
- Media type: Print (Hardback)
- Pages: 189 pp

Man and Power: the Story of Power from the Pyramids to the Atomic Age is a science book for children by L. Sprague de Camp, illustrated with documents, photographs by Russ Kinne, Roman Vishniac, and others, and paintings by Alton S. Tobey, first published in hardcover by Golden Press in 1961.

== Summary ==
As stated on the cover, the work is a survey of "the story of power from the pyramids to the atomic age." It traces the "progression of man's discovery and utilization of power ... in chapters dealing consecutively with the different sources of power--animal, wind, water, steam, internal combustion, chemical, electrical, and nuclear power, and possible future sources."

== Partial Contents ==
- Manpower
- Animal Power
- Wind Power
- Water Power
- Steam Power
- Internal-combustion Power
- Chemical Power
- Electric Power
- Nuclear Power

== Reception ==
Thomas Goonan, writing for Library Journal, rated the book "[r]ecommended," praising its "[e]xcellent illustrations" that "elucidate the text" and "[g]ood index. Comparing it to Edward Stoddard's The Story of Power, he judged de Camp's work "[m]ore comprehensive and detailed."

The Science News-Letter, in its September 23, 1961 issue, listed the book among its "Books of the Week," describing the work as a "[c]olorful panorama depicting and describing man's development of sources of energy to help him build, move around and produce."

The Booklist considered the subject "effectively presented in well-written text and a multitude of supplementary [illustrative materials], all captioned and most of them in color. Its review repeated Goonan's judgment of the work as "more comprehensive" than Stoddard's. In appraising the work for older children, The Booklist noted it was "[j]uvenile in approach but may be useful in high schools, particularly for its illustrations.

Isaac Asimov, writing for The Horn Book Magazine, called it "an exciting book written with great authority and illustrated lavishly," noting that "[f]or young people interested in mechanics and machinery this book is a complete feast." He finds that "[t]he human mind is the hero throughout," with "[t]he personalities of scientists interest[ing] Mr. de Camp only as they affect the scientists as conveyors of new thoughts."

Claire Huchet Bishop in The Commonweal praised the book's "[e]xcellent approach which makes less of the machines than it does of the minds that created them."

Henry W. Hubbard in The New York Times wrote that "Mr. de Camp has filled his book with accurate information and absorbing history," but noted that while "[t]he writing is usually good, ... the first chapter, on manpower, suffers from jarring transitions, and the detailed explanations of steam engines and such are occasionally hard to follow." He finds the illustrations "colorful and skillfully chosen. They are, in fact, the high point of the book." Summing up, he states that "[b]y virtue of its thoroughness, and its informative illustrations, "Man and Power" should be especially useful in libraries and schools."
