= Jean Cau, l'indocile =

2024 book by Ludovic Marino and Louis Michaud

- Author: Ludovic Marino; Louis Michaud
- Language: French
- Subject: Jean Cau
- Genre: biography
- Publisher: Éditions Gallimard
- Publication date: 11 April 2024
- Publication place: France
- Pages: 336
- ISBN: 9782073051400

Jean Cau, l'indocile is a 2024 biography about the French writer and journalist Jean Cau. It was written by Ludovic Marino and Louis Michaud and published by éditions Gallimard. It was the first biography about Cau and traces his life and work, from his Catalan, farmer and socialist family background, through his time as a young left-wing intellectual in the circle of Jean-Paul Sartre in the 1940s and 1950s, and into his later conservative writings, characterised by anti-Americanism and complaints about the decadence of Western culture.
