= Anant Priolkar =

Indian writer (1895–1973)

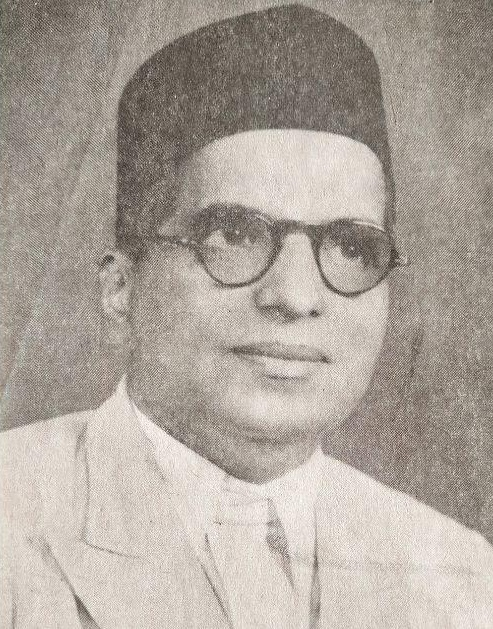
- Born: Anant Kakba Priolkar; 1895
- Died: 1973 (aged 77–78); Maharashtra, India
- Occupations: Polemicist; writer; political activist
- Years active: 1900s–1973
- Known for: The Goa Inquisition (1961)

Anant Kakba Priolkar (1895 – 1973) was an Indian polemicist, writer and political activist. He was elected as the President of the Akhil Bharatiya Marathi Sahitya Sammelan held in 1951 at Karwar, Karnataka, India. His book The Goa Inquisition (1961) remains his bestselling work. He died in Maharashtra in 1973.

== Early life ==
Anant Kakba Priolkar was born in 1895.

== Literary career ==
Priolkar was active in the field of Marathi literature and served as secretary of the Marathi Sahitya Parishad, a research organisation sponsored by the government of Bombay. He worked as a writer, editor, and translator, and played a role in building literary institutions in Maharashtra. He was also associated with the Bombay-based publishing house D B Taraporevala Sons and Co., where he helped produce works across multiple disciplines.

== Scholarly work ==
Priolkar is recognised for his scholarly contributions to the study of the history of printing and Indo-Portuguese interactions. He was among the first to argue that the first printing press in Asia arrived in Goa in 1556, marking the beginning of print culture in India. This argument was presented in his work The Printing Press in India: Its Beginnings and Early Development, published in 1958 by the Marathi Samshodhan Mandal. His work drew on Portuguese records and presented evidence that the first press in India was used to print texts in Latin and Konkani, including religious materials produced by Jesuit missionaries.

Priolkar’s research expanded the understanding of early Indian book history and challenged dominant narratives that located the origins of Indian print primarily in Bengal. He also wrote extensively about the Goa Inquisition, bringing attention to its violence and impact.

== Views ==
Priolkar's book, The Goa Inquisition, is criticized for its exaggerated views of the Goa Inquisition and presenting a perspective that people converted to Catholicism out of fear.

He strongly advocated for the merger of Goa into Maharashtra, even though the majority of Goans rejected the idea in the 1967 Goa status referendum. He also considered Konkani as a dialect of Marathi language.

== Bibliography ==
- The Printing Press in India: Its Beginnings and Early Development being a quatercentenary commemoration study of the advent of printing in India in 1556. Bombay: Marathi Samshodhana Mandala, 1958.
- The Goa Inquisition (A Quatercentenary Commemoration Study of the Inquisition in India, printed by V. G. Moghe at Mumbai University Press, Mumbai) (1961)
- Granthik Marathi Bhashya Ani Kokani Boli (ग्रान्थिक मराठी भाषा आणि कोकणी बोली).
- "French Author of a Marathi Purana, Fr. Etienne de la Croix." Journal of the University of Bombay n.s. 29/2 (1959) 122–149.
- Goa Re-discovered. Bhakta Books International, 1967.
- Priya Ani Apriya (प्रिय आणि अप्रिय)
