= Charles Dellon =

French explorer and physician

Charles Gabriel Dellon (17 December 1649, Agde – c. 1710), also known as Gabriel Dellon, was a 17th-century French physician and writer, mostly known for his work Relation de l'Inquisition de Goa published in 1687.

Dellon traveled widely during his life. Aged 17, he embarked in Port-Louis (Morbihan) as second surgeon on board the ship La Force. He landed in Daman, Portuguese India, in 1673 and had serious problems with the Portuguese Inquisition. Back in France, he completed his studies and entered the service of Prince de Conti. He later married the daughter of a wealthy butcher and settled in Paris, where he died around 1710.

The work for which he is known, Relation de l'lnquisition de Goa, published for the first time in 1687 in Leiden and in 1688 in Paris, was a great success, immediately translated into German, English and Dutch and reedited several times during the 18th century. In this book, Dellon narrates his trial and incarceration by the Portuguese Inquisition in Goa, Daman and later in Brazil and Lisbon, totaling 18 months. He was accused of denying the validity of baptism and having blasphemed against the adoration of a crucifix, and in addition to having criticized the Inquisition. He was excommunicated, saw all his property confiscated, and was sentenced to five years of galleys. This story had an enormous influence on later writers, such as Voltaire, who drew inspiration in his Candide.

Dellon also wrote Relation d'un voyage des Indes orientales and Traité des maladies particulières aux pays orientaux.

== Sources ==
L'Inquisition de Goa. La relation de Charles Dellon (1687). Étude, édition & notes de Charles Amiel & Anne Lima, Chandeigne, 1997.
