= Alton Tobey =

American painter, historical artist, muralist, portraitist, illustrator, and teacher

- Born: November 5, 1914; Middletown, Connecticut
- Died: January 4, 2005 (aged 90); Mamaroneck, New York
- Education: Yale University School of Fine Arts
- Known for: historical painting, illustration, murals, portraits

Alton Stanley Tobey (November 5, 1914 – January 4, 2005) was an American painter, historical artist, muralist, portraitist, illustrator, and teacher of art.

== Biography ==
Alton Tobey was born in Middletown, Connecticut on November 5, 1914. At the age of 20 he received a scholarship to Yale University; School of Fine Arts. After serving in the military, he completed his postgraduate academic degree at Yale, also becoming one of the Professors. He resided for most of his life in the village of Larchmont, part of a town in Mamaroneck, Westchester County, New York. He was married to Roslyn Tobey, a piano instructor and musician. Their son, David Tobey, is a painter and musician.They also have a daughter, Judy.

Tobey died on January 4, 2005, at a nursing home in Mamaroneck, New York.

The New York Times obituary described Tobey as "a muralist, portraitist and illustrator whose renderings of famous events and faces hang in museums, libraries, public buildings, corporate offices and private collections". Tobey is ranked by the Artists Trade Union of Russia amongst the world-best artists of the last four centuries".

== Style ==
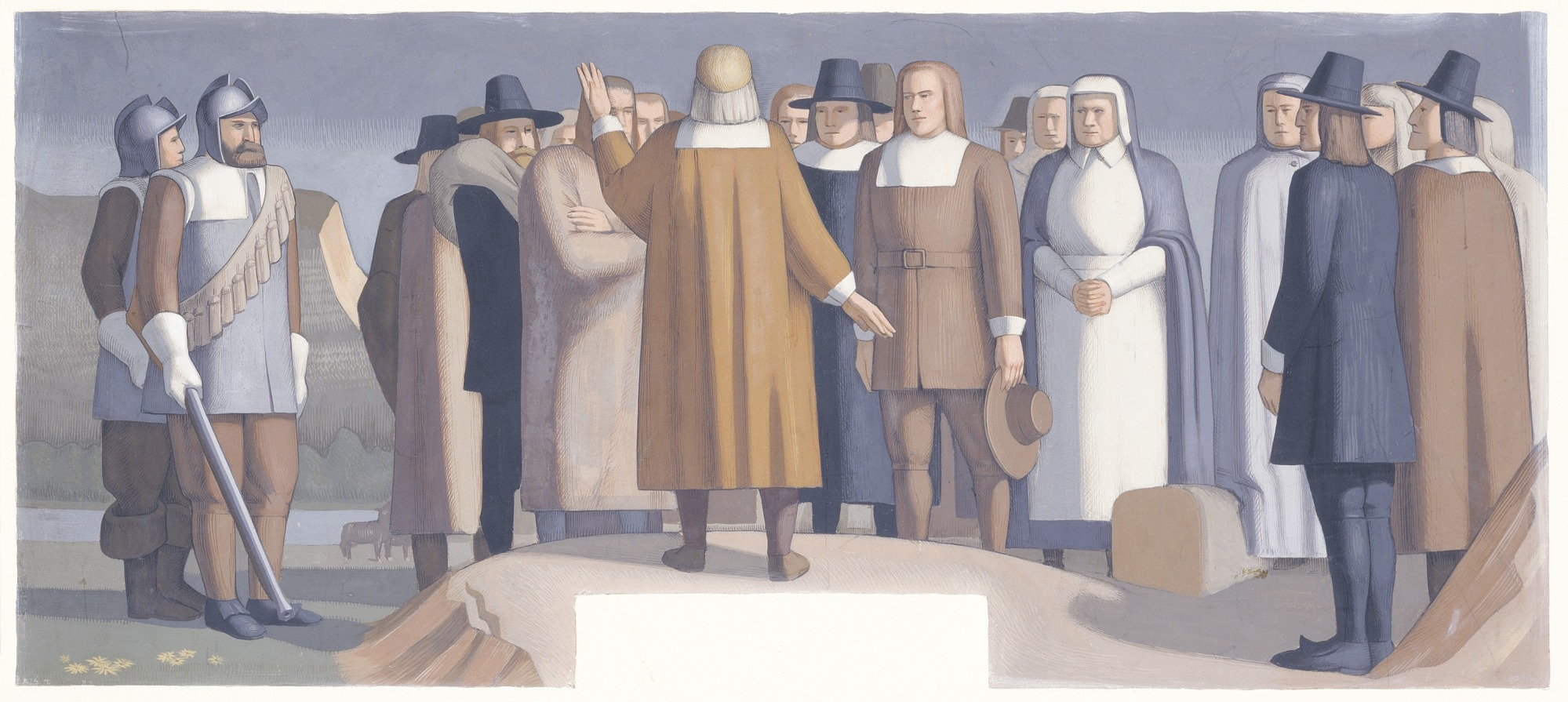
The Last Halt: The Stop of Hooker’s Band in East Hartford before Crossing the River (1939), study for Tobey's mural at the post office in East Hartford, Connecticut. The completed mural is extant but has been damaged.

Referring to the dichotomy between his realist works and his curvilinears and other modernist works, Tobey once said, "I live an artistic double life: one of classical realism and the other of aesthetic exploration."

=== Realist work ===
Tobey's murals, illustrations, and portraits show him working in the realistic style for which he is best known.

His murals on historical subjects are the most widely seen of Tobey's works, prominently displayed in many public places in the US and elsewhere. These include public institutions in his native Connecticut; the Smithsonian Institution and other venues in Washington, DC; New York's Intrepid Sea-Air-Space Museum; and even an officers club in Saudi Arabia. Indeed, the Larchmont Gazette obituary (see 'External links') states, "Alton Tobey was best known for the murals, which he called 'symphonies of painting'." Alton Tobey was president of the National Society of Mural Painters from 1984 to 1988.

As a realist painter and illustrator, Tobey is also famously the creator of the hundreds of paintings which illustrate the twelve volumes of "The Golden Book History of the United States". Additionally, he did many illustrations for Sport magazine, Life, and Time-Life books. Millions of children, whether they knew it or not, grew up gazing at Alton Tobey's vivid imaginings of historical events (such as one depicting a scene from the Russian revolution). Michael Bierut wrote a tribute for Design Observer magazine that begins: "Alton Tobey died the week before last. Chances are you've never heard of him, but when I was eight years old, I had no doubt about one thing: Alton Tobey was the best artist in the world." Tobey's works are included in the collection of the National Museum of American Illustration.

In his work as a frequently commissioned portraitist, Tobey had the honor of painting portraits of many prominent figures. These included Pope John Paul II, the poet Robert Frost, and Albert Einstein. In fact, it was while Einstein was sitting for his portrait (during the 1940s), that a cordial acquaintance began which yielded an important gem of artistic inspiration: Einstein's remark that there are really no straight lines in nature led to Alton Tobey's invention of his signature "curvilinear" style - one of his experimental genres.

=== Abstract and experimental work ===
Besides the realist works, Tobey also created less well known paintings in several personal idioms.

Among the several experimental styles, perhaps the most original works (that is, immediately recognizable as having been painted by Alton S. Tobey and no one else) are those in an abstract (or semi-abstract) idiom using a curious "visual alphabet" of his own invention. These he called his "curvilinears" ("Sailboats", shown here, is an example). He created some sculptures in this idiom as well. These abstract works, just as much as those in his realistic vein, display a distinctive and exacting draftsmanship.

Also in a modern (or even postmodern) vein are his series of "fragments": bizarre portraits, mostly of famous people, consisting of extreme closeups of only parts of (usually) the head or face, often far off-center. A particularly amusing example is "Thatcher's Thatch", consisting only of the British Prime Minister's famous hairdo jutting up from the bottom of the canvas. There are also grotesque and piercingly angry paintings of social commentary, sometimes verging on protest art, such as "Our Hero", an over-muscled monster with a tiny infant's head, embodying belligerent and stupid militarism. A portrait of Ronald Reagan called The Making of a President shows the President's head bizarrely stretched and multiplied across the canvas into a menacing, many-eyed creature, culminating on the far right with a disembodied Reagan smile hovering mid-air, bounded by sphincterish wrinkles which extend into the smoky brown background. It would not appear to express reverence or affection.

== See also ==
- Illustration
- Mural
- Portrait
- Realism
- Federal Art Project
- National Museum of American Illustration

== Sources ==
- Davenport, R. J.; Davenport's art reference & price guide (Davenport's Art Reference; Ventura, Calif.; biennial (every 2 years) ISSN 1540-1553; OCLC: 18196910
- Falk, Peter H.; Who was who in American art (Madison, Conn. : Sound View Press, 1985) ISBN 0-932087-00-0
- Kalfatovic, Martin R.; The New Deal fine arts projects (Metuchen, N.J. : Scarecrow Press, 1994) ISBN 0-8108-2749-2
- Mallett, Daniel Trowbridge Mallett; Mallett's Index of artists, international-biographical (supplement) (New York : P. Smith, 1948) OCLC: 4119402
