= The Goa Inquisition =

1961 history book by Anant Priolkar

- Title page for The Goa Inquisition, Being a Quatercentenary Commemoration Study of the Inquisition in India (1961)
- Author: Anant Kakba Priolkar
- Language: English
- Subject: Goa Inquisition
- Publisher: Bombay University Press
- Publication date: 1961
- Publication place: India
- Pages: 264
- ISBN: 978-0-8364-2753-0

The Goa Inquisition, Being a Quatercentenary Commemoration Study of the Inquisition in India is a book published by Bombay University Press and authored by Anant Priolkar. It is a narrative of the Goa Inquisition organised by the rulers of Portuguese Goa.

== Details ==
=== Part I ===
The book is divided into two parts. Part I, titled "The Goa Inquisition", is divided into ten chapters. The first two chapters detail the Spanish Inquisition and Portuguese Inquisition in Europe providing background material and context that would lead to the inquisition in India. A fictional story of unrequited love is used as the basis for the anti-Semitism of Tomas de Torquemada. The book also makes the origin of the Portuguese Inquisition based on the love of King Manuel I of Portugal for Princess Isabella of Aragon, instead of politics. (The arrival of Jews to Portugal after their expulsion from Spain was a security threat to the Kingdom of Portugal, because Sephardic Jews had an established reputation in Iberia for joining forces with Moors to overthrow Christian rulers.)

Chapter 3 begins with the advent of the Inquisition in India, with a discussion of the French spy Dellon's account of the inquisition in Chapter 4. The successive chapters describe the wars that led to the establishment of Portuguese rule in Goa, and the alleged massacre of Hindus during the Portuguese conquest of Goa in 1510. However, various sources claim that only Bijapur Muslims were killed during the conquest, by both the Portuguese led by Afonso de Albuquerque and the local Hindus led by Timoji.

Successive chapters in Part I also describe the forced conversion of Hindus to Christianity by the Goa Inquisition. Délio de Mendonça claims that the book completely contradicts contemporary historical accounts of voluntary conversions of entire villages in Goa by the various religious orders (Dominicans, Jesuits and Franciscans), but the book doesn't provide any contemporary basis for its version of history. The book details the organization and procedures of the Inquisition and the anti-Hindu laws that were passed in Goa during the inquisition banning Hindu religious ceremonies and customs from being continued by converted Hindus, as well as reducing the status of Hindus to second-class citizens by banning them from public gatherings and so on.

The book also discusses the various methods of torture used by the Inquisition, such as burning by sulphur, water-torture, rape, the use of pulleys to stretch victims and the "strappado" method of torture. The study of Agostino Borromeo from the University of La Sapienza in Roma into the Vatican archives and the subsequent 783-page report denies the allegations made in the book.

=== Part II ===
Part II discusses the accounts of the Inquisition given by Dellon and Buchanan in two separate chapters. Priolkar cites Buchanan as an authoritative source, although Buchanan's work was a Protestant polemic written in the 19th century that denounced Catholicism in Goa and it did not use any historical records.

== Reception ==
British historian C. R. Boxer described the book as a "dispassionate and objective account of the Goa Inquisition" and praised its "excellent use" of the relevant Portuguese sources. German-American scholar Gerald M. Moser described Priolkar's account as objective and restrained on the whole, writing that the work's merit lies in its translation and summarisation of important documents and in it discussing them from a modern Hindu perspective. However, Indian historian Dale Luis Menezes criticised the book as "methodologically flawed" and claimed that it relied too heavily on "Black Legend propaganda" in its interpretation of the Inquisition.

== Editions ==
- Priolkar, A.K 1961, "The Goa Inquisition, Being a Quatercentenary Commemoration Study of the Inquisition in India", Bombay University.
