= Term of Trial (novel) =

1961 novel by James Barlow

- First edition
- Author: James Barlow
- Language: English
- Publisher: Hamish Hamilton
- Publication date: 1961
- Publication place: United Kingdom
- Media type: Print (hardback and paperback)
- Pages: 307 pp
- Preceded by: The Patriots
- Followed by: The Hour of Maximum Danger

Term of Trial is a novel by British author James Barlow, first published in 1961 by Hamish Hamilton. The story is divided between a school environment and a courtroom, and it portrays a weak, alcoholic schoolteacher who is accused of indecently assaulting a female pupil. The book was adapted for a film the following year.

== Plot ==
Graham Weir is a middle-aged schoolteacher at Railway Street Secondary School. A timid, self-loathing alcoholic, he is taunted and despised by his pupils, his colleagues and his wife. Recognizing a like-minded soul in one of his pupils, he takes her under his wing and offers to give her extra assistance. The girl soon claims to have fallen in love with him and attempts to lead him into an affair. Surprised, Weir declines her unwelcome advances as gently as possible and disengages himself from her. However, following an accusation by the pupil, he is charged with indecent assault, and he is forced to defend himself in court from the criminal charge itself and from the derision and lack of empathy that surrounds him.

== Film adaptation ==
Term of Trial is the film adaptation, released in 1962, directed by Peter Glenville and starring Laurence Olivier, Simone Signoret, Sarah Miles and Terence Stamp.
