= The Heroic Age of American Invention =

1961 science history book by L. Sprague de Camp

- Dust-jacket
- Author: L. Sprague de Camp
- Cover artist: Robert Flynn
- Language: English
- Subject: American history
- Publisher: Doubleday
- Publication date: 1961
- Publication place: United States
- Media type: Print (Hardback)
- Pages: 290 pp
- OCLC: 1299638
- Dewey Decimal: 608.773
- LC Class: T212 .D4

The Heroic Age of American Invention is a science book for children by L. Sprague de Camp, published by Doubleday in 1961. It was reprinted in 1993 by Barnes & Noble under the alternate title The Heroes of American Invention. The book has been translated in Portuguese.

== Summary ==
By "heroic age" the author means the era of American history in which individual initiative and enterprise constituted the primary thread in technical innovation, roughly from the early 19th century until mass production and corporate enterprise outpaced that of the individual around the time of World War I. The story of innovation is told through the biographies and inventions of thirty-two key inventors of the United States' Industrial Revolution, whom de Camp feels were pivotal in converting the country from an agrarian nation to an industrial one.

Some of the inventors spotlighted include Robert L. Stevens, George Westinghouse, Joseph Henry, Samuel Morse, Samuel Colt, Hiram Stevens Maxim, Hudson Maxim, Cyrus McCormick, John Ericsson, William Kelly, Ottmar Mergenthaler, Christopher Latham Sholes, Alexander Graham Bell, Thomas Edison, Elihu Thomson, Nikola Tesla, George Baldwin Selden, Samuel Pierpoint Langley, Wilbur Wright, Orville Wright, Reginald Aubrey Fessenden, Lee de Forest, and Edwin Howard Armstrong.

== Contents ==
- I. Invention Comes to America
- II. The Heroic Age Begins
- III. The Stevenses and Railroading
- IV. Henry, Morse, and the Telegraph
- V. Colt and Other Gunmakers
- VI. McCormick and Farm Machinery
- VII. Ericsson and the Modern Warship
- VIII. Kelly and Steel Refining
- IX. Mergenthaler, Sholes, and Writing Machines
- X. Bell and the Telephone
- XI. Edison and the Electric Light
- XII. Thomson and Alternating-Current Power
- XIII. Selden and the Automobile
- XIV. Langley, The Wrights, and Flying
- XV. Fessenden, De Forest, and Radio
- XVI. The End of the Heroic Age
- Notes
- Bibliography
- Index
