= Sid Chaplin =

English writer

- Born: 20 September 1916; 23 Bolckow Street, Shildon, County Durham
- Died: 11 January 1986 (aged 69); Grasmere (village), Cumbria
- Citizenship: United Kingdom
- Occupations: Novelist, essayist, screenwriter
- Writing career
- Language: English
- Notable works: The Day of the Sardine, The Watchers and the Watched
- Website: sidchaplin.com

Sid Chaplin OBE (20 September 1916 – 11 January 1986) was an English writer whose works (novels, television screenplays, poetry and short stories) are mostly set in the north-east of England, in the 1940s and 1950s.

== Biography ==
Chaplin was born into a Durham mining family and worked in the pits as a teenager. Between 1941 and 1953, he resided at Ferryhill, County Durham and worked as a miner at Dean and Chapter Colliery at Dean Bank. In 1946, he won the Atlantic Award for Literature for his collection of short stories, The Leaping Lad. After another stint as a miner, Chaplin began writing full-time for the National Coal Board magazine, Coal, from 1950. He later wrote for The Guardian, including theatre reviews, essays of social observation and, from 1963, his own column Northern Accent.

Chaplin's literary career pre-dated the so-called angry young men genre and has been credited as an influence on the late 1950s – early 1960s "kitchen sink" social realism of writers such as Alan Sillitoe and Stan Barstow. His novels The Day of the Sardine (1961) and The Watchers and the Watched (1962) have been cited as classics of "working class existentialism" and were republished most recently by Flambard Press in 2004.

In 1968, playwright Alan Plater based his play and musical production Close The Coalhouse Door on Chaplin's early writings, set to songs by Alex Glasgow. The musical was revived in 2012. In 1976, Chaplin contributed to the writing of the TV series When The Boat Comes In. The following year he was awarded an OBE for services to the arts in the North East.

Chaplin died in 1986. A posthumous anthology In Blackberry Time was published the following year. In 1997, the Chaplin family deposited the bulk of Sid Chaplin's papers at Newcastle University's Robinson Library, Special Collections.

His son is Michael Chaplin.

== Selected bibliography ==
=== Novels ===
- My Fate Cries Out (1949, 1973)
- The Thin Seam (1949; republished 1968 with additional stories)
- The Big Room (1960)
- The Day of the Sardine (1961, 1965, 1973, 1983, 1989 [with foreword by Melvin Bragg], 2004)
- The Watchers and the Watched (1962, 1965, 1973, 1989 [with foreword by Stan Barstow], 2004)
- Sam in the Morning (1965, 1967, 1989 [with foreword by Alan Plater])
- The Mines of Alabaster (1971)

=== Short stories ===
- The Leaping Lad (1946, 1970)
- On Christmas Day in the Morning (1978)
- The Bachelor Uncle and Other Stories (1980)

=== Misc ===
- The Lakes to Tyneside (1951) [guidebook]
- The Smell of Sunday Dinner (1971) [essays]
- A Tree With Rosy Apples (1972) [essays]
- In Blackberry Time (1987, 1986) [anthology]
- Hame (2016) [anthology]
