= The Mercy of God =

1961 novel by Jean Cau

- Author: Jean Cau
- Original title: La Pitié de Dieu
- Translator: Richard Howard
- Language: French
- Publisher: Éditions Gallimard
- Publication date: 29 September 1961
- Publication place: France
- English publication date: 1963
- Pages: 275

The Mercy of God (French: La Pitié de Dieu) is a 1961 novel by the French writer Jean Cau. It tells the story of four murderers—a doctor, a boxer, a workman and a gambler—who share a prison cell and tell their respective stories. An English translation by Richard Howard was published in 1963.

The novel was awarded the Prix Goncourt.

== Reception ==
Hans Koningsberger of The Saturday Review called the book "a splendid novel", and wrote: "The tradition of the book is very Sartrian and very French[.] Cau has continued and greatly contributed to this pattern rather than emulated it. The formula may sound pat, the book is fresh and original." The critic continued: "I objected, at least in this translation, to the similarity in speech between four men of such vastly different background, but, apart from that—a minor point—this novel deserves nothing but praise."
