= James Barlow (author) =

British novelist

- Born: 1 December 1921; Birmingham, England
- Died: 30 January 1973 (aged 51); Cork, Ireland
- Occupation: Writer

James Barlow (1 December 1921 – 30 January 1973) was a British novelist. The author of thirteen novels and one work of non-fiction, he was married with 4 children when he died suddenly at the age of 51. He is buried near Cork.

== Biography ==
James Henry Stanley Barlow was born Henry James Stanley Barlow on 1 December 1921 in Birmingham, England. During his childhood, Barlow lived in various locations in the West Midlands, his father Stanley having to move fairly frequently for his job with a bank. The family eventually settled in Wales due to Stanley’s ill health, a problem dating back to his military service in WW1. After Stanley died, in 1936, the Barlow family returned to Birmingham. Upon leaving school, James attended a commercial college before joining the Birmingham Corporation Water Department. At the outbreak of WW2 he enlisted with the RAF, serving as a gunner, then gunnery instructor before being invalided out with tuberculosis. He began writing during his long convalescence, initially contributing articles to aeronautical magazines. He later began to write articles and stories for other magazines, including Punch. After he had recovered his health, Barlow returned to the Birmingham Corporation as a water rates inspector and began to write in earnest.

His first novel, The Protagonists, drawing on his experiences in Wales and his time recovering from TB in a sanatorium, was published in 1956. Although receiving some critical acclaim with this and his next two books, he did not achieve real success until 1960, with the publication of The Patriots, a story of war veterans struggling to adjust to civilian life and drifting into a life of crime.

In 1969 Barlow moved with his family to Tasmania in Australia but returned a few years later and settled in Ireland. He died suddenly on 30 January 1973 in Cork.

== Bibliography ==
- The Protagonists (1956)
- One Half of the World (1957)
- The Man with Good Intentions (1958)
- The Patriots (1960)
- Term of Trial (1961)
- The Hour of Maximum Danger (1962)
- This Side of the Sky (1964)
- One Man in the World (1966)
- The Burden of Proof (1968) Reissued as Villain in 1971
- Goodbye England (1969)
- Liner (1970)
- Both Your Houses (1971)
- In All Good Faith (1971)

== Film adaptations ==
- Term of Trial (1962) (based on novel)
- Villain (1971) (based on novel The Burden of Proof)
