= Jean Cau (writer) =

French writer and journalist (1925–1993)

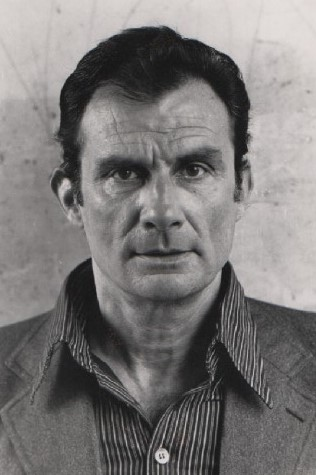

Jean Cau (8 July 1925, in Bram, Aude – 18 June 1993) was a French writer and journalist.

Born in Bram, Aude, he was secretary to Jean-Paul Sartre, after which he was a journalist and reporter for L'Express, Figaro, and Paris Match. In 1961, he was awarded the Prix Goncourt for his novel The Mercy of God. Cau also wrote several works about bullfighting and Spain.

In addition to novels and journalism, he wrote two plays as well as co-writing the screenplay for the successful 1970 French gangster film Borsalino starring Alain Delon. He collaborated on the screenplays or television scripts for several other productions.

From the 1970s onwards, he grew close to GRECE and his writings became infused with a sun-worshipping neopaganism. Jacques Marlaud dedicated an entire chapter to Cau in his study on contemporary literary and philosophical paganism.

The biography Jean Cau, l'indocile by Ludovic Marino and Louis Michaud was published in 2024.

== Works ==
- Le Fort intérieur, Gallimard, 1948
- Maria-nègre, Gallimard, 1948 ISBN 978-2-07-021284-2
- Le coup de barre, Gallimard, 1950 ISBN 978-2-07-021285-9
- Le tour d'un monde, Gallimard, 1952 ISBN 978-2-07-021286-6
- Les Paroissiens, Gallimard, 1958 ISBN 978-2-07-021287-3
- Mon village, Gallimard, 1958 ISBN 978-2-07-021288-0
- Vie et mort d'un toro brave, Gallimard, 1961
- The Mercy of God (La pitié de Dieu), Gallimard, 1961 ISBN 978-2-07-021290-3, ISBN 978-2-07-036556-2 (Prix Goncourt)
- Les Parachutistes - Le maître du monde, Gallimard, 1963 ISBN 978-2-07-021291-0
- Le Meurtre d'un enfant, Gallimard, 1965 ISBN 978-2-07-021292-7
- Lettre ouverte aux têtes de chiens occidentaux, Albin Michel, 1967 ISBN 978-2-226-04576-8
- "Un testament de Staline", Grasset, 1967 ISBN 978-0-03-618675-6
- "Les yeux crevés", Gallimard, 1968 (pièce de théâtre)
- Le pape est mort, La Table Ronde, 1968 ISBN 978-2-7103-2218-4
- Le spectre de l'amour, Gallimard, 1968 ISBN 978-2-07-026885-6
- L'agonie de la vieille, La Table Ronde, 1969 ISBN 978-2-7103-2206-1
- Tropicanas, de la dictature et de la revolution sous les tropiques, Gallimard, 1970 ISBN 978-2-07-026887-0
- Les Entrailles du taureau, Gallimard, 1971 ISBN 978-2-07-027995-1
- Le temps des esclaves, La Table Ronde, 1971 ISBN 978-2-7103-1686-2
- Les entrailles du taureau, Gallimard, 1971 ISBN 978-2-07-027995-1
- Ma misogynie, Julliard, 1972
- Les écuries de l'occident - traité de morale, La Table Ronde, 1973 ISBN 978-2-7103-1228-4
- La grande prostituée - traité de morale II, La Table Ronde, 1974 ISBN 978-2-7103-2315-0
- Les Enfants, Gallimard, 1975 ISBN 978-2-07-029166-3
- Pourquoi la France, La Table Ronde, 1975 ISBN 978-2-7103-1585-8
- Lettre ouverte à tout le monde, Albin Michel, 1976 ISBN 978-2-226-00374-4
- Otages, Gallimard, 1976 ISBN 978-2-07-029433-6
- Une nuit à Saint-Germain des Près, Julliard, 1977 ISBN 978-2-260-00070-9
- Discours de la décadence, Copernic, 1978 ISBN 978-2-85984-015-0
- Une Passion Pour Che Guevara, Julliard, 1979 ISBN 978-2-260-00139-3
- Nouvelles du paradis, Gallimard, 1980 ISBN 978-2-07-029994-2
- La Conquête de Zanzibar, Gallimard, 1980 ISBN 978-2-07-029037-6
- Le grand soleil, Julliard, 1981 ISBN 978-2-260-00253-6
- La barbe et la rose, La Table Ronde, 1982 ISBN 978-2-7103-0091-5
- Une rose à la mer, La Table Ronde, 1983 ISBN 978-2-7103-0131-8
- Proust, le chat et moi, La Table Ronde, 1984 ISBN 978-2-7103-0190-5
- Croquis de mémoire, Julliard, 1985 ISBN 978-2-260-00402-8, ISBN 978-2-266-01674-2, ISBN 978-2-7103-2889-6
- Mon lieutenant, Julliard, 1985 ISBN 978-2-260-00420-2
- Sévillanes, Julliard, 1987 ISBN 978-2-260-00508-7
- Les culottes courtes, Le Pré-aux-Clercs, 1988 ISBN 978-2-7144-2126-5, ISBN 978-2-253-05608-9
- La grande maison, Le Pré-aux-Clercs, 1988 ISBN 978-2-7144-2292-7
- Le choc de 1940, Fixot, 1990 ISBN 978-2-87645-092-9
- Les oreilles et la queue, Gallimard, 1990 ISBN 978-2-07-071986-0
- Le roman de Carmen, Editions de Fallois, 1990 ISBN 978-2-87706-087-5
- La rumeur de Mazamet, Le Pré aux Clers, 1991 ISBN 978-2-7144-2666-6
- L'ivresse des intellectuels : Pastis, Whisky et Marxisme, Plon, 1992 ISBN 978-2-259-02517-1
- L'innocent, Flammarion, 1992 ISBN 978-2-08-064456-5
- Nimeno II, torero de France, Marval, 1992 ISBN 978-2-86234-106-4
- La folie corrida, Gallimard, 1992 ISBN 978-2-07-072666-0
- Au fil du lait, Educagri, 1993 ISBN 978-2-86621-176-9
- Contre-attaques : éloge incongrue du lourd, Labyrinthe, 1993 ISBN 978-2-86980-011-3
- L'orgueil des mots, Filipacchi, 1995 ISBN 978-2-85018-374-4 (posthumous)
- Fernando Botero, la corrida, La Bibliothèque des Arts, 2001 ISBN 978-2-85047-159-9 (posthumous)
- Monsieur de Quichotte, Le Rocher, 2005 ISBN 978-2-268-05166-6 (posthumous or re-edited ?)
