= Some of Your Blood =

Novel by Theodore Sturgeon

- First edition
- Author: Theodore Sturgeon
- Language: English
- Genre: Horror
- Publisher: Ballantine Books
- Publication date: 1961
- Publication place: United States
- Pages: 143
- OCLC: 9363762

Some of Your Blood is a short horror novel in epistolary form by American writer Theodore Sturgeon, first published in 1961.

== Plot summary ==
The book opens with a prologue addressed directly to "The Reader", informing the reader of the fictional basis of the novel. The novel presents as a case file of Dr. Philip Outerbridge and attempts to "falsely" emphasize the fictional basis of the novel.

The novel takes place in the middle of an unnamed war. The novel focuses on George Smith, an American soldier, transferred to the military psychiatric clinic, where Outerbridge works. Smith was brought to the clinic due to a confrontation with a superior officer. Smith was labeled psychotic and told to recount his story in the third person.

Smith's autobiography takes up about half of the book, describing his childhood as the son of the town drunk. Smith is imprisoned for shoplifting, and eventually joins the army as a means of escaping an uncomfortable situation with his lover, Anna.

The rest of the book consists of documents relating to Outerbridge's treatment of Smith, therapy sessions and correspondence between Outerbridge and his superior, the increasingly impatient Colonel Williams. By using information gained in his treatment to fill in the gaps in the narrative, Outerbridge deduces Smith to be a non-supernatural vampire who feels compelled to drink blood at times of emotional crisis.

The novel ends with an explanation of various potential and unrealized outcomes.
