= Han Dong (writer) =

Chinese writer

Han Dong (Chinese: 韩东; pinyin: Hán Dōng; born 17 May 1961) is a Chinese writer.

Dong was born in Nanjing but spent much of his childhood in the countryside, where his parents had been "sent-down" during the Cultural Revolution.

== Published works ==
- Banished! (扎根). Translated by Nicky Harman. Honolulu: University of Hawaii Press, 2009.
- A Phone Call from Dalian: Selected Poems of Han Dong. Translated by Nicky Harman. Brookline: Zephyr Press, 2012.
- A Tabby-cat's Tale. Translated by Nicky Harman. Berlin: Frisch & Co., 2014.
