= M. J. Alexander =

American writer (born 1961)

Mary Jane Alexander
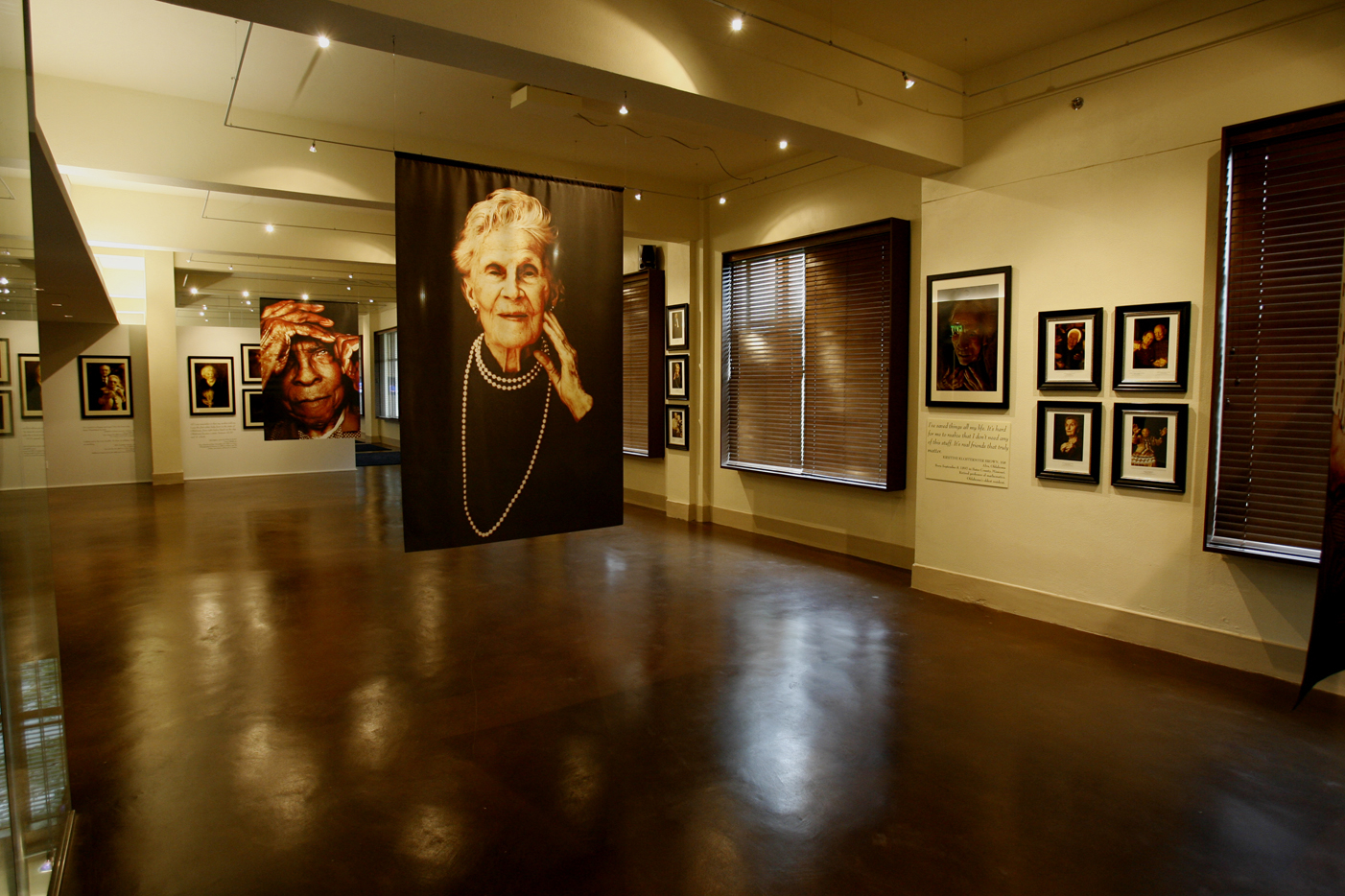
- "Portraits of Centenarians" on display in the Tulsa World Gallery of the Oklahoma Heritage Association
- Born: July 18, 1961 (age 65); Sault Ste. Marie, Michigan, U.S.
- Education: Vassar College; Columbia University Graduate School of Journalism
- Occupations: Writer; photographer; playwright; poet; lyricist
- Awards: Oklahoma Journalism Hall of Fame

Mary Jane Alexander (born July 18, 1961) is an American writer and photographer, playwright, poet, and lyricist who documents people and places of the American West, with an emphasis on centenarians and American Indian culture. She was inducted into the Oklahoma Journalism Hall of Fame in 2019. During the pandemic, her work expanded into site-specific public art installations focusing on text and soundscapes that "amplify and illuminate facets of our collective shadowed history."

== Early life and education ==
Alexander is a dual citizen of Canada and the United States, raised in the Upper Peninsula of Michigan. She attended a two-room schoolhouse before graduating from Vassar College and Columbia University Graduate School of Journalism.

== Career ==
She is a veteran of the Associated Press in New York City and former head of the journalism department of Saint Michael's College in Vermont.

== Documentary work ==
Alexander "combines the vision of an artist with the skills of a storyteller", according to the International Photography Hall of Fame and Museum. Her photographs have been featured in more than 20 solo shows since 2006, including at the Oklahoma State Capitol, the Red Earth Museum, and the Main Gallery of the International Photography Hall of Fame. Her iconic portrait of Thomas Jefferson Brown, 103, was named one of the top photographs in Oklahoma history by the editors of Oklahoma Today magazine.

She is author and illustrator of two books: Salt of the Red Earth: A Century of Wit and Wisdom from Oklahoma's Elders, portraits and interviews with 100 centenarians, including dozens born in Indian Territory and Portrait of a Generation - Children of Oklahoma: Sons and Daughters of the Red Earth featuring interviews with and environmental portraits of more than 250 Oklahomans from varied walks of life. The book launch and opening exhibit for Portrait of a Generation were hosted by the Oklahoma City Museum of Art; a collection of 36 of Alexander's fine art portraits was shown in the OKCMOA Founders' Gallery in 2011. The book was a finalist in two categories and selected as top young adult book of the year at the 2011 Oklahoma Book Awards, sponsored by the Oklahoma Center for the Book.

=== Exhibitions ===
Alexander and Knight collaborated on the European debut of "Oklahoma", a 2018 retrospective encompassing 20 years of interviews and photographs. The exhibit included more than 100 images accompanied by a sound installation created by Knight in The Crypt Gallery of London.

Reception to the work inspired the multimedia project "Quotelahoma," where Alexander combined image and text to create "mash-ups of decontextualized lyrics and Oklahoma photographs, combined with some modern signs, vernacular sayings and quotes excerpted from interviews from around the state." Her street-art posters were installed in urban centers of Europe, becoming part of what she termed a "multi-layered, multi-lingual urban artscape of protest and proclamation". The 100-piece solo exhibit A Dream Waiting to Unfold: Portraits of Oklahoma by M.J. Alexander, was featured in Fall 2023 at the Crystal Bridge Conservatory Art Gallery of the Myriad Botanical Gardens.

In June 2024, the Smithsonian Institution's Hirshhorn Museum featured "Echoes of an Ancient Sun," a new public art work by Alexander and Knight, in the exhibition Sound Scene 2024: Solstice. The museum described the installation as "an interactive GPS-powered experience featuring on-site field recordings and evocative soundscapes inspired by the history and mysteries of Oklahoma’s Spiro Mounds."

=== Critical acclaim ===
Alexander was honored at the 2009 UNESCO-sponsored World Humanity Photography Awards in Guangzhou, China, for her photographic series on Apache Crown Dancers. Of her ongoing portrait series of indigenous peoples, a reviewer wrote: "Alexander’s imagery moves beyond stereotypes to reflect not only a difficult and challenging past but today’s American Indian renaissance and hopeful future….[offering] deep connection to the ancient and modern and to human transience. Now and then the earth shifts and if we're looking, art such as this can bring indescribable joy in the simple act of connecting to the human spirit. Such is the gift of Alexander's portraits."

"M.J. Alexander has a way of seeing the world that shows it to you," according to the Alice Walker. "The layers of it that are sometimes ignored or overlooked, especially in our country. A brilliant photographer." Suzanne Tate, executive director of the Oklahoma Arts Council, calls Alexander "a transcendent visual storyteller...Her distinct style and abilities as an artist make her an invaluable cultural asset." Heidi Evans of the New York Daily News calls the work "remarkable, moving photographs and words that reveal the inner lives and quiet power of ordinary people -- people you might otherwise pass by. M.J. Alexander shows the poetry deeply rooted in the Oklahoma -- and American -- landscape."

From a public radio feature on Alexander's "Salt of the Red Earth" centenarian project: "Many of us who work in radio would say that hearing the undoctored human voice is about as intimate as you can get. But take one look at M.J. Alexander’s stunning sepia-toned portraits of Oklahomans over 100 years old, and there’s a certain timeless quality that seems to capture the essence of who these people are for all eternity."

From a 2010 feature on the release of her second book: "The true storytellers mine deep into the hearts and souls of their subjects...M.J. Alexander knows well the power of storytelling that uses both words and images. This month sees the release of an extraordinary new book by the award-winning Oklahoma City photographer and writer, as she continues her exploration of the people who are the heart and soul of her adopted home state."

Alexander's writing and photo features have been recognized with several awards from the Society of Professional Journalists. Her portraits of Alice Walker and Gloria Steinem were featured on the cover of the Fall 2009 issue of Ms. magazine, commemorating Steinem’s 75th birthday. A second portrait of Walker by Alexander was the cover photograph of the October 2010 Writer's Digest, and was discussed by Walker on her personal blog. She was recognized by Lake Superior State University in her hometown of Sault Ste. Marie with the Kenneth J. Shouldice Achievement Award for "personal and professional successes."

== Creative writing ==
Alexander is also a poet, playwright and lyricist. With her husband, composer Edward Knight, she has created two full-length musicals: Strike A Match (1999) and Night of the Comets (2001), both premiered at the Bass School of Music at Oklahoma City University. Cradle of Dreams, their work for chorus and orchestra, was commercially recorded by the Kyiv Philharmonic and the Kyiv Chamber Choir.

Alexander and Knight’s song cycle, Tales Not Told, is based on her poems exploring the viewpoints of six American ancestors of the composer: Helen Harvey Tiffany Paddock, Patience Brewster, Keziah Keyes Ransom, Sarah Town Bridges Cloyce, Bessie Barton Paddock, and Mary Dyer. The work has been performed in New York, Oklahoma and California, including by the San Francisco Cabaret Opera, and published by Subito Music. The work was the subject of a doctoral dissertation by Catherine McDaniel at the University of Oklahoma. A national reviewer called the poems "beautiful" and the cycle "intriguing, heartfelt, and beautifully crafted."

Alexander and Knight created the oratorio "Of Perpetual Solace," commissioned in honor of the 25th anniversary of the Murrah Building bombing and presented in a hybrid taped-and-live performance by Canterbury Voices and the Oklahoma City Philharmonic at Civic Center Music Hall. Her text "wove together her original writings with excerpts from poets including Sara Teasdale, Edgar Allen [sic] Poe and Robert Frost; biblical passages from the Book of Job and Psalm 23; speeches by Martin Luther King, who preached at nearby Calvary Baptist Church; pieces of President Bill Clinton’s eulogy delivered at the bombing site in the hours after the 1995 attack; and the gravestone epitaph of Comanche leader Quanah Parker." During the pandemic, Alexander was commissioned to install "I Killed I Can’t," a permanent multimedia display in the Light Gallery of the Oklahoma City Underground featuring 20 of her portraits of and interviews with Oklahoma centenarians, and to author two original poems, which were then sandblasted into the sidewalks of eight Oklahoma City parks.

She was commissioned to create a "garden of quotes" to pay tribute to famous residents of Norman, Oklahoma. Her "In Their Words" installation featured sidewalk engravings and laser-cut steel stencils that create shadowed text that travel across the park. The installation in Andrews Park was later expanded to include an interactive public art soundscape entitled Sound Trekking. The GPS-activated app was created by Alexander and Knight’s Oklahoma-based creative collaborative, Opus 46, "specializing in site-specific public art that reveals and celebrates untold stories of people and places." The project was winner of an Artistic Innovations | Media Arts award from the Mid-America Arts Alliance.
