= The Primal Urge =

1961 novel by Brian Aldiss

- Richard M. Powers
- Author: Brian Aldiss
- Language: English
- Genre: Science fiction novel
- Publisher: Ballantine Books
- Publication date: 1961
- Publication place: United States
- Media type: Print (Paperback)
- Pages: 191 pp

The Primal Urge is a 1961 science fiction novel by Brian Aldiss. A satire on sexual reserve, it explores the effects on society of a forehead-mounted "Emotion Register" that glows when the wearer experiences sexual attraction. The book was banned in Ireland.

== Reception ==
John Clute and David Pringle in The Encyclopedia of Science Fiction positively opined on the novel, calling it "an amusing treatment of Sex as an sf theme".

Reviews:

- Review by Alfred Bester in The Magazine of Fantasy & Science Fiction, April 1962
- Review by S. E. Cotts in Amazing Stories, April 1962
- Review by P. Schuyler Miller in Analog Science Fact → Science Fiction, May 1962
- Review by Jim Groves in Vector, no. 17, Autumn 1962
