= Derek Bok Public Service Prizes =

Harvard University award

The Derek Bok Public Service Prize is one of the prizes awarded by Harvard University during the annual commencement which happens in May. The award which is a cash prize along with a citation, medal given to graduating Harvard Extension School students. It was established entirely by gifts from members of the Harvard Extension School Alumni Association. The award recognizes creative initiatives in community service or long-standing records of civic achievement. All degree and certificate candidates in the Harvard Extension School are eligible for the prize in the year of their graduation. The Harvard Extension School instituted the Derek Bok Public Service Prize which honors the former President of Harvard University Derek Bok for his interest in encouraging public service by all Harvard students.

Bok taught law at Harvard beginning in 1958 and was selected dean of the law school there (1968–1971) after Dean Erwin Griswold was appointed Solicitor-General of the United States. He then served as the university's 25th president (1971–1991), succeeding Nathan M. Pusey. In the mid-1970s Bok negotiated with Radcliffe College president Matina Horner the "non-merger merger" between Harvard and Radcliffe Colleges that was a major step in the final merger of the two institutions. Bok recently served as the faculty chair at the Hauser Center for Nonprofit Organizations at Harvard, taught at the Harvard Graduate School of Education, and is the 300th Anniversary University Professor at Harvard's Kennedy School of Government. After fifteen years away from the Harvard presidency, Bok led the university on an interim basis from Lawrence Summers's resignation on July 1, 2006, until the beginning of the tenure of Drew Gilpin Faust on July 1, 2007.

Derek Bok Public Service Prize Winners
Year of the Award	Winner(s)
2002	Stephen Gendron Michael Francis Maltese
2003	Jane Catherine Eppley Elaine Victoria Grey
2004	Eileen Mary Weisslinger Lucia Dentice-Clark Ria Merrill Riesner
2005	Carole Y. Rein Brent J. Sakoneseriiosta Maracle
2006	Betty King Cuyugan Siza Mtimbiri Oliver Orion Wilder-Smith
2007	James E. Constable Jennifer Leigh Tucker Jeffrey W. White
2008	Pierce Durkin Roberto Guerra
2009	Hilary J. Blocker Melissa Ekin Kizildemir David Lichter
2010	Scott Michael Frasca Diane Carol Hopson Jonathan Igne-Bianchi Macarena Morales Perez
2011	Miranda Vitello
2012	Nidal Al-Azraq
2013	N/A
2014	David Joshua Havelick David Robert Penn Linda Powers Tomasso
2015	Sowmyan Jegatheesan
2016	Reima Yosif Shakeir
2017	Laura Ann Buso Shalhavit Simcha Cohen Karen M. Hudson Lounsbury
2018	Haili Cassaundra Francis Enal Shawqi Hindi Moshe Ohayon
2019	Donald Thomas Parker Ramakrishna Raju Justin Henry Williams
2020	Andrew Almazan Anaya Marilena Dania Bernadette O'Connell de la Flor
2023	Leonora Anyango Heather Watkins Weronika Jasmina Forts Varnit Shanker
2024	Falechiondro Karcheik Sims-Alvarado Daniel Kyoung-Youl Jang Jaime Rolando (J.R.) Castillo
2025	Maria Miller Larson Matthew Paul Olson Kirsten von Reinholtz
