= Ideonomy =

Science of ideas

Ideonomy is a combinatorial "science of ideas" developed by American independent scholar Patrick M. Gunkel (1947–2017). Specifically, Ideonomy is concerned with the systematic organization of ideas and the discovery of the rules behind how ideas combine, diverge, and transform. Gunkel defined ideonomy as "the science of the laws of ideas and of the application of such laws to the generation of all possible ideas in connection with any subject, idea, or thing." In his 1992 book A History of Knowledge, Charles Van Doren compared ideonomy to a "mining operation" that excavates meanings and thought to discover treasures hidden deep within language.

Sources from the 1980s and 1990s demonstrate that ideonomy was useful to academic researchers in fields including biology, toxicology, and nursing/patient care. Beginning in the 2010s, academics in a wide range of fields including machine learning, marketing, computational modeling, and cybersecurity have relied on materials generated for ideonomy to provide methodological support for their research.

== Etymology and definition ==
The word "ideonomy" combines the Greek roots ideo- (from idea, meaning pattern or form) and -nomy (from nomos, meaning law or custom). The suffix -nomy suggests the laws concerning or the totality of knowledge about a given subject, as in astronomy or taxonomy.

In a note posted on the MIT ideonomy website, Gunkel states that the word was supposedly first coined by the French Encyclopedists to refer to a science of ideas. No evidence is provided for this statement, however. The concept bears some relationship to Antoine Destutt de Tracy's "ideology" (1796), which originally meant a systematic science of ideas before acquiring its modern political connotations.

Gunkel provided several metaphorical descriptions of ideonomy:

- An "idea bank": a computer network enabling systematic exploration of infinite possible ideas
- A "kaleidoscope" that can exhibit all possible combinations and transformations of ideas
- A "prism" capable of diffracting any idea into its cognitive components
- A "gigantic microscope for magnifying the ideocosm"

== History and development ==
In 1984, Gunkel received a five-year unsolicited grant from the Richard Lounsbery Foundation of New York to develop ideonomy. A June 1, 1987 article on the front page of The Wall Street Journal brought Gunkel and ideonomy to wider public attention. Some academics were interested in using ideonomy's techniques, including biologist Betsey Dyer, who published several contemporaneous peer-reviewed studies citing ideonomy. Academic researchers in the field of toxicology and nursing/patient care also used ideonomy.

However, ideonomy's broadest contribution to date came beginning in the 2010s, as a list of personality traits generated for combinatorial matching was used by researchers in artificial intelligence to code human emotions for machine-learning tasks, develop computational models related to personality, develop a measurement framework for influencer-brand recommender systems, and aid information awareness/cybersecurity assessment.

== Methodology ==
The foundational empirical method of ideonomy involves the systematic creation of extensive lists. Gunkel's apartment reportedly contained thousands of lists on every conceivable topic.

Gunkel termed each list an "organon," which he described as expanding through "combination, permutation, transformation, generalization, specialization, intersection, interaction, reapplication, recursive use, etc. of existing organons."

The ideonomic process follows a progressive structure. The ideonomist begins with a simple list of examples of a particular idea, concept, or thing. The list need not be exhaustive. By studying this list, the ideonomist isolates and identifies types. This categorical analysis then reveals missing items, allowing the primary list to be improved and refined.

Gunkel emphasized that list items must not only cover genuine categories of nature but also be formulated in ways that yield the largest possible number of syntactically coherent possibilities when combined.

The core technique of ideonomy is "ideocombinatorics"—the systematic intersection and combination of items from different lists to generate novel composite concepts. Gunkel developed computer programs to automate this process.

For example, combining a list of 230 Universal Elementary Shapes (pits, pyramids, trenches, hemispheres, needles) with a list of 74 Types of Order (recurrence, identity, likeness of parts) yields 17,020 possible "shapes of order." These combinations, when phrased as questions ("Can there be pits of recurrence?"), could suggest new categories of phenomena worthy of investigation.

The computer-generated output is typically repetitive and often meaningless. However, with sufficient frequency, the combinations yield results that are unexpectedly interesting and fruitful.

In one documented case, Gunkel's programs generated 45,540 questions about toxins for microbiologist David Bermudes. One question—"Can hierarchies of cell process be used as a basis for classifying toxic action?"—prompted Bermudes to develop a novel approach to classifying biological toxins by the type of molecule they attack, rather than by chemical structure or physiological system affected.

According to one contemporaneous account of ideonomy, "Gunkel takes for his field all fields and all ideas about anything. He uses a computer to generate lists of words and phrases and by juxtaposition reviews the resultant patterns for novel ideas. The computer is ideal for this task because the mind would rebel at the formidable processing task ideonomy involves. What we have here is computer generated originality."

== Applications ==
Gunkel and his supporters identified several practical applications for ideonomic methods:

Scientific research: Biologist Betsey Dyer of Wheaton College published research crediting ideonomy for helping to generate ideas.

Medical science: When Austin pathologist Michael T. O'Brien was presented with the ideonomically-generated question "Can arteries have rashes?", he initially dismissed it as nonsense. Upon reflection, he realized that large arteries are supplied with blood by tiny vessels that might become inflamed and dilated, analogous to skin vessels in a rash—a phenomenon potentially worth researching.

Analogical thinking: Harvard law professor Robert Clark used ideonomic analogies to write a research paper comparing plant structure with human hierarchies.

Artificial intelligence: Douglas Lenat, a researcher at Microelectronics and Computer Technology Corporation (MCC) in Austin, suggested that Gunkel's lists enumerating types of human mistakes could help design AI systems capable of recognizing and correcting their own errors.

== Reception and criticism ==
Ideonomy received mixed reactions from the academic and scientific communities. Prominent supporters included:

- Edward Fredkin, former director of MIT's computer science laboratory, who praised Gunkel's "provocative ideas on artificial intelligence."
- Marvin Minsky, AI scientist and MIT professor, who described ideonomy as "perhaps the most extensive study of ways to generate ideas."
- Frederick Seitz, president emeritus of Rockefeller University, who noted Gunkel's "encyclopedic scope"
- Robert C. Clark, Harvard law professor, who called Gunkel "the most intelligent person I ever met"

However, skeptics questioned whether ideonomy constituted a genuine science. Fredkin himself noted that Gunkel "pours out about 60 ideas a minute, and 59 of them are bad," though he added that "even with one good idea out of 60, it's still an amazing accomplishment." Douglas Lenat observed that brainstorming with Gunkel was "a bit like being hit over the head by the muse with a sledgehammer" and that "he puts people off."

Gunkel himself acknowledged that ideonomy was in its infancy and might seem "absurdly utopian." His planned magnum opus on ideonomy remained incomplete, and was posted on an MIT website thanks to faculty advisor Whitman Richards. Gunkel wrote: "Pioneering in a completely new field, yes in a new science, is almost unreal. It is heartbreaking, it is pitiable, it is almost inhuman. Honestly, it is a hell. There is nothing heroic about it."

== Related concepts ==
Gunkel identified several historical precedents for ideonomic thinking:

- Gottfried Wilhelm Leibniz (1646–1716): The philosopher's work on a universal characteristic (characteristica universalis) and calculus of reasoning
- Peter Mark Roget (1779–1869): Creator of Roget's Thesaurus, which organized concepts into a systematic taxonomy
- Dmitri Mendeleev (1834–1907): Developer of the periodic table, demonstrating how combining lists of element families could reveal previously unseen connections
- Fritz Zwicky (1898–1974): The Caltech astrophysicist whom Gunkel called the "grandfather of ideonomy" for his development of "morphological research"—systematic exploration of all possible solutions to problems

Ideonomy is also related to but distinct from "ideology" in its original sense. When Antoine Destutt de Tracy coined "ideology" in 1796, he intended it as a rigorous science dealing with the systematic analysis of ideas and their origins. This original meaning was later supplanted by the modern political connotation.

Notably, the combinatorial discovery process Gunkel identified as central to ideonomy is in use today by inventors who task AI with running through cross-domain permutations until a novel combination (e.g., between shapes and device types) is discovered with potential applied value. These scientists appear to think of novel matches surfaced by the AI as "hallucinations."

Other academic work in computational creativity has recognized the applied value of combinatorial methods without identifying ideonomy by name. For example, a 2023 paper in Leonardo presents the results of a deep learning neural network experiment that identified optimized configurations based on user preferences. The authors state: "This methodology is projected to have many applications in fashion, architecture, music, storytelling, cooking, or any other design or art field that can be represented as a set of permutations." This is precisely the way Gunkel saw a science of ideas working, as the methodology for ideonomy is not applicable to a single discipline, but treats any discipline that uses parameter spaces as discovery mechanisms. For example, a May 2022 workshop at Akademie Schloss Solitude called "Modifying Food Texture," presented by Agnes Cameron and Gary Zhexi Zhang, used ideonomy to explore novel industrial food texture modification techniques.

== Legacy ==
Gunkel died in 2017, leaving ideonomy without its primary developer. Although citations and use cases for ideonomy continue to appear in literature, the field has not yet achieved the institutional recognition or widespread adoption that Gunkel originally envisioned.

When questioned about the utility of ideonomy, Gunkel invoked Benjamin Franklin's response when asked about the usefulness of electricity immediately after its invention: "What use is a newborn baby?" Gunkel suggested that ideonomy, like other nascent sciences, required time to demonstrate its potential.

== See also ==
- Artificial Intelligence
- Combinatorics
- Computational creativity
- Epistemology
- Idea
- Ideology
- Morphological analysis
- Systems theory
- TRIZ
