= Griswold Hall =

Harvard Law School building

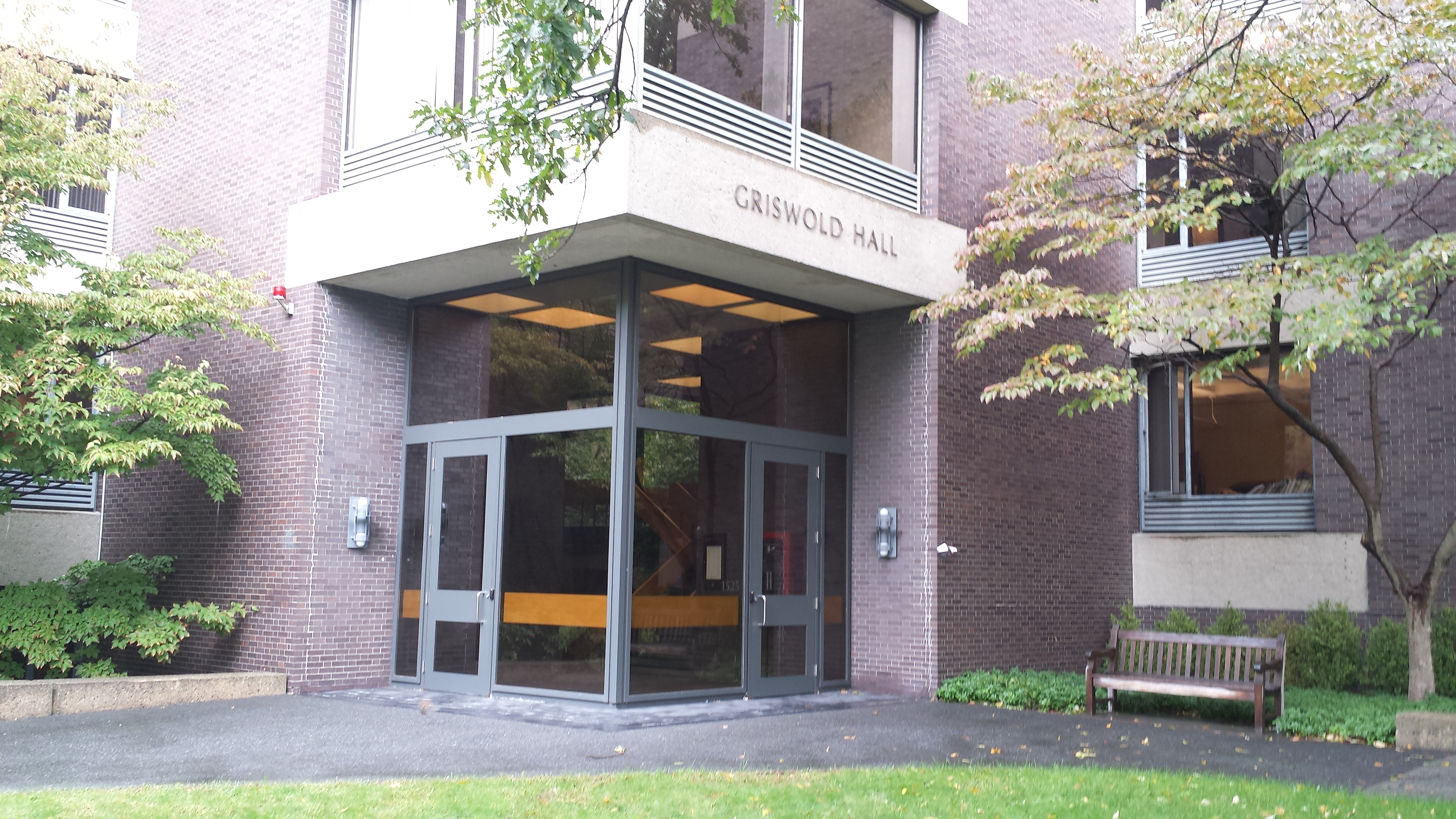

Griswold Hall, built in 1967 according to a design by Benjamin Thompson Associates, is a Harvard Law School building housing faculty offices, the dean's office, and a classroom. According to Bainbridge Bunting, Griswold Hall and nearby Roscoe Pound Hall together "constitute the most adroit example of design for a given environment produced at Harvard since World War II, an achievement that equals Charles Coolidge's best work of the 1920s."

It was named for retired Harvard Law School Dean Erwin Griswold in 1979.
