= Gunkel =

Gunkel (variant Gunckel) is a surname of German origin. Notable people with the name include:

== Gunkel ==
- Claus Killing-Günkel (born 1963), German interlinguist
- Daniel Gunkel (1980), German football midfielder
- David J. Gunkel (born 1962), American academic
- Hermann Gunkel (1862–1932), German Old Testament scholar
- Patrick M. Gunkel (1947-2017), American futurist and founder of ideonomy, the science of ideas
- Ray Gunkel (1924–1972), American professional wrestler
- Red Gunkel (1894–1954), American Major League Baseball pitcher
- Wolfgang Gunkel (1948–2020), German rower

== Gunckel ==
- Hugo Gunckel Lüer (1901–1997), Chilean pharmacist, botanist, and university professor
- Lewis B. Gunckel (1826–1903), American attorney, politician, and advocate
