= Matthew Stephenson =

Matthew Stephenson may refer to:

- Matthew C. Stephenson, professor of law at Harvard Law School
- Matt Stephenson, Canadian ice hockey player
- Matt Stephenson (racehorse trainer) (1735-1808), Epsom Derby-winning jockey and trainer
