= Albert Sacks =

American lawyer (1920–1991)

Albert M. Sacks
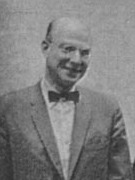

8th Dean of Harvard Law School
- In office 1971–1981
- Preceded by: Derek Bok
- Succeeded by: James Vorenberg

Personal details
- Born: August 15, 1920 New York City, U.S.
- Died: March 22, 1991 (aged 70) Boston, Massachusetts, U.S.
- Spouse: Sadelle Sacks
- Children: Janet Sacks; Margery Ablon
- Education: City College of New York (BA); Harvard University (LLB)
- Profession: Lawyer

Albert Martin Sacks (August 15, 1920 – March 22, 1991) was an American lawyer and former dean of Harvard Law School.

== Life and career ==
Born in New York City to Jewish immigrants from Russia, he attended City College of New York graduating in 1940. After serving in World War II, he attended Harvard Law School, where he was president of the Harvard Law Review, and graduated in 1948.

He then served as a law clerk for judge Augustus N. Hand of the United States Court of Appeals for the Second Circuit and from 1949 to 1950 for Justice Felix Frankfurter of the Supreme Court of the United States. After working as an associate at Covington & Burling in Washington for two years, he joined the faculty of Harvard Law School in 1952 and served for 39 years. He succeeded Derek Bok as Dean of Harvard Law School in 1971.

Sacks died at Massachusetts General Hospital in 1991.

== See also ==
- List of law clerks for the second seat of the Supreme Court of the United States
