= Patrick Gunkel =

American futurist and independent scholar

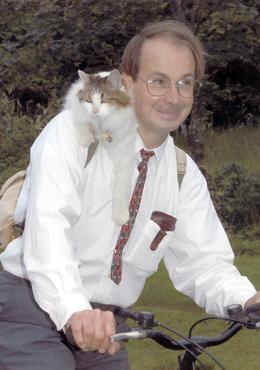
Patrick Gunkel on his bike with his cat, Sinbad, on his shoulder.

Patrick M. Gunkel (1947 – 2017) was an American futurist and independent scholar best known as the originator of ideonomy, a combinatorial "science of ideas". Although he never graduated high school or received a college degree, his career included positions at the Hudson Institute, MIT, and the University of Texas.

According to a 1990 Boston Globe article, Gunkel was "regarded as a genius" by "a coterie of academics." The article quotes Robert C. Clark, former Dean of Harvard Law School, as remarking that Gunkel was "the most intelligent person I ever met."

== Futurist writings ==
Gunkel was credited by AI pioneer Marvin Minsky as the originator of the term "telepresence." Gunkel was also cited by American science fiction writer Larry Niven for inventing the concept of the topopolis space habitat.

In 1970, Gunkel's essay "The Year 3000" was included in an essay collection called The High School Revolutionaries. The book included Gunkel's essay under the subheading "The High School Drop-Out as Intellectual."

In October 1975, the Hudson Institute published a comprehensive report by Gunkel on space industrialization called The Future of Space: An Encyclopedic Prospect. The L-5 Society noted the publication in their December 1975 newsletter, and an official NASA publication dated March 1978 identifies Gunkel's report as containing useful information regarding contact with extraterrestrial civilizations.

Gunkel was also cited as a contributor on the Hudson Institute's 1976 long-range forecast The Next 200 Years: A Scenario for America and the World.

== The Efflorescent World View ==
According to his Hudson Institute colleague Leon Martel, Gunkel was one inspiration for Martel's book Mastering Change.

Martel wrote that Gunkel developed a "dramatic vision of a future of endless boundless development, where 'existence is a perpetual dawn.'" Martel described Gunkel's future vision as being set forth in a number of his writings, including The Efflorescent World View.

Martel also described Gunkel's vision as "a provocative forecast of the future which is both awesome in its imaginative sweep and convincing in its conception."

== Ideonomy ==
Guido Enthoven describes Gunkel's ideonomy as one of three pioneering attempts to create a science of ideas (the others being Antoine Destutt de Tracy's original notion of ideology and Genrich Altshuller’s TRIZ "system of inventive problem solving"), while Minsky described ideonomy as "perhaps the most extensive study of ways to generate ideas".

An archive of Gunkel's ideonomy work was assembled by MIT faculty advisor Whitman Richards.

== Child prodigy advocacy ==
Gunkel was also an advocate for child prodigies. According to a 1980 New York Times article, Gunkel spent "much of his time and income trying to help gifted youngsters." The article notes that several parents of gifted children agreed Gunkel was "brilliant," and Gunkel estimated that he had "helped" about 50 gifted children.

Further, in a phone conversation with Gunkel in October 1980, American linguist and businessman Eugene Garfield reported that Gunkel encourages child prodigies by "recommending and buying them books, putting them in contact with other prodigious youths, meeting with them to answer and pose challenging questions, and giving their parents reassurance they are not alone."

In the Acknowledgements section of Nature's Gambit: Child Prodigies and the Development of Human Potential, researcher David Henry Feldman thanked Gunkel for contributions to the book.
