= Derek Bok =

American lawyer and college administrator (born 1930)

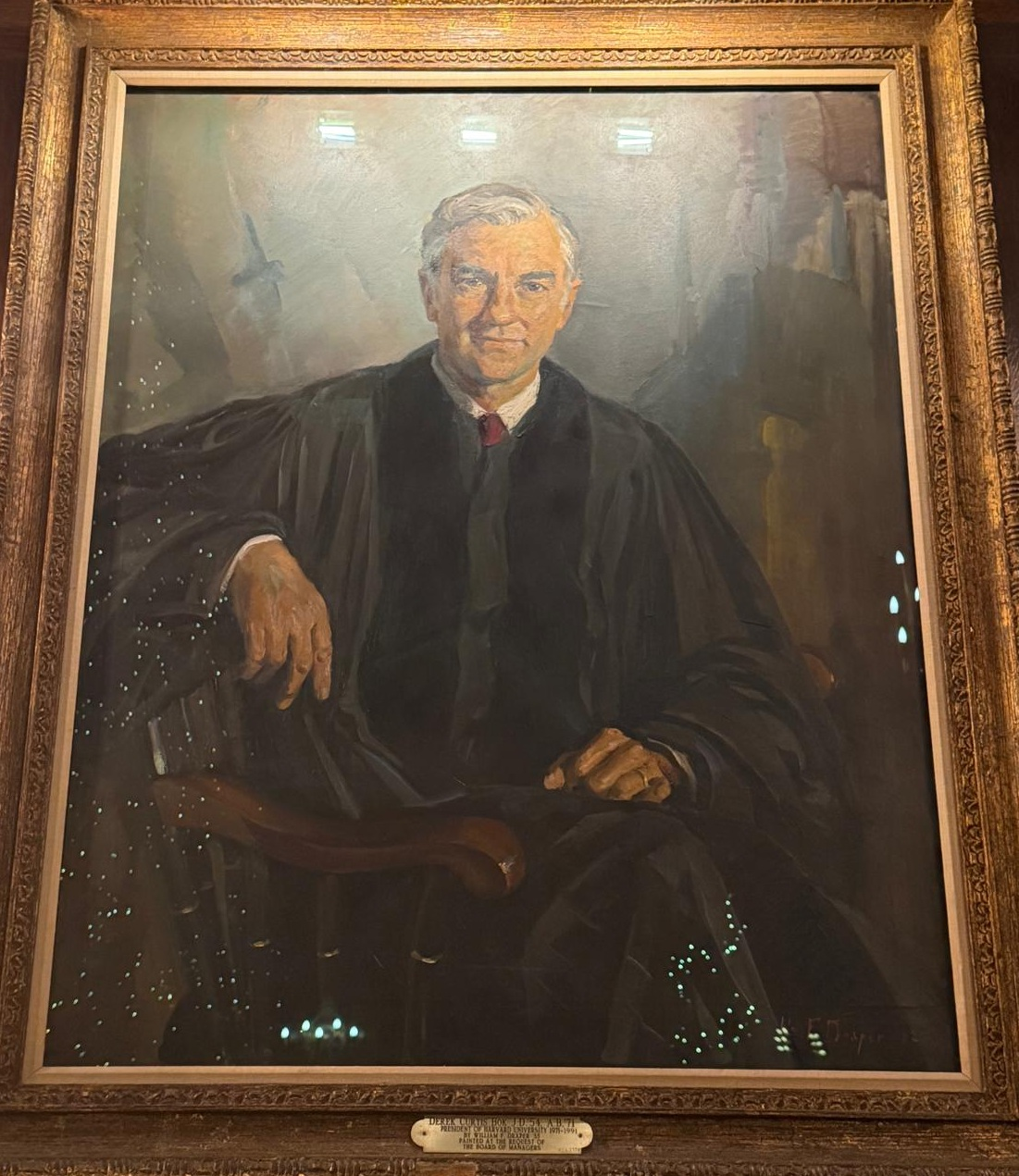

25th President of Harvard University
- Acting; July 1, 2006 – June 30, 2007
- Preceded by: Larry Summers
- Succeeded by: Drew Gilpin Faust
- In office July 1, 1971 – June 30, 1991
- Preceded by: Nathan M. Pusey
- Succeeded by: Neil Leon Rudenstine

7th Dean of Harvard Law School
- In office 1968–1971
- Preceded by: Erwin Griswold
- Succeeded by: Albert Sacks

Personal details
- Born: Derek Curtis Bok; March 22, 1930 (age 96) Bryn Mawr, Pennsylvania, U.S.
- Spouse: Sissela Myrdal (m. 1955)
- Parent: Curtis Bok (father)
- Relatives: Edward Bok (grandfather); Mary Louise Curtis (grandmother); Cyrus H. K. Curtis (great-grandfather); Hilary Bok (daughter); Gordon Bok (cousin)
- Education: Stanford University (BA); Harvard University (JD); George Washington University (MA); Sciences Po
- Occupation: Lawyer, college administrator

Derek Curtis Bok (born March 22, 1930) is an American lawyer and educator who served as the 25th president of Harvard University from 1971 to 1991 and acted temporarily in the position from 2006 to 2007. He previously served as the 7th Dean of Harvard Law School from 1968 to 1971.

== Early life and education ==
Bok was born in Bryn Mawr, Pennsylvania, on March 22, 1930 to Philadelphia attorney Curtis Bok and Margaret Plummer Bok. Following his parents' divorce, his mother moved several times with her three children, ultimately to Los Angeles, where Bok spent much of his childhood. He graduated from Stanford University (B.A., 1951), Harvard Law School (J.D., 1954), attended Sciences Po, and George Washington University (A.M., 1958).

Derek Bok's father remarried, and was elected to the Supreme Court of Pennsylvania in 1958, serving as a justice until his death in 1962. Derek Bok's stepmother was peace advocate Nellie Lee Holt Bok.

== Career ==
Bok taught law at Harvard beginning in 1958 and was selected dean of the law school there (1968–1971) after Dean Erwin Griswold was appointed Solicitor-General of the United States. He then served as the university's 25th president (1971–1991), succeeding Nathan M. Pusey. He was installed as president in a private ceremony in the Faculty Room of University Hall, given his predecessor abruptly stepping down after the botched handling of anti-Vietnam War protests on campus.

In the mid-1970s, Bok negotiated with Radcliffe College president Matina Horner the "non-merger merger" between Harvard and Radcliffe Colleges that was a major step in the final merger of the two institutions. Bok recently served as the faculty chair at the Hauser Center for Nonprofit Organizations at Harvard, taught at the Harvard Graduate School of Education, and is the 300th Anniversary University Professor at Harvard Kennedy School.

Bok's focus on undergraduate education was evident in his initiating the Harvard Assessment Seminar that resulted in Richard J. Light's best-selling book, Making the Most of College: Students Speak Their Minds (Harvard University Press, 2001). This focus has continued in Bok's numerous publications since retiring as Harvard president. He was the recipient of the 2001 University of Louisville Grawemeyer Award in Education for his book, The Shape of the River: Long-Term Consequences of Considering Race in College and University Admissions, co-authored with the former President of Princeton University, William G. Bowen.

The Derek Bok Center for Teaching and Learning at Harvard was created during Bok's Harvard presidency, reflecting Bok's concern for the quality of pedagogy employed at research universities like Harvard and its peers around the world. self sourced The Harvard Extension School instituted the Derek Bok Public Service Prizes, an annual Commencement prize for the Harvard Extension School students who involve in community service or who have a long-standing records of civic achievement.

Bok served as interim president of Harvard from Lawrence Summers's resignation on July 1, 2006, to the beginning of Drew Gilpin Faust presidency on July 1, 2007. He is a member of both the American Academy of Arts and Sciences and the American Philosophical Society.

== Personal life ==
Through his father, Bok is the grandson of Dutch-born Ladies' Home Journal editor Edward Bok and Mary Louise Curtis, founder of the Curtis Institute of Music; the cousin of prominent Maine folklorist Gordon Bok; and the great-grandson of Cyrus H. K. Curtis, founder of the Curtis Publishing Company, publisher of national magazines such as The Saturday Evening Post.

In 1955, Bok married Swedish sociologist and philosopher Sissela Bok (née Myrdal) (daughter of the Swedish economist Gunnar Myrdal and the politician and diplomat Alva Myrdal, both Nobel laureates), who received her doctorate from Harvard in 1970. His daughter, Hilary Bok, is a philosophy professor at Johns Hopkins University.

== Bibliography ==
- Cox, Archibald; Bok, Derek (1962), Cases and Materials on Labor Law, Brooklyn, NY: Foundation Press
- Bok, Derek C.; Dunlop, John T. (1970), Labor and the American Community, New York: Simon & Schuster, ISBN 0671203665
- Bok, Derek (1982), Beyond the Ivory Tower, Cambridge, MA: Harvard University Press, ISBN 0674068998
- Bok, Derek (1983), "Foreword", in Harvard Nuclear Study Group (ed.), Living with Nuclear Weapons, Cambridge, MA: Harvard University Press, pp. xiii–xvii, ISBN 0674536657
- Bok, Derek (1986), Higher Learning, Cambridge, MA: Harvard University Press, ISBN 0674391756
- Bok, Derek (1990), Universities and the Future of America, Durham, NC: Duke University Press, ISBN 9780822310365
- Bok, Derek (1996), The State of the Nation, Cambridge, MA: Harvard University Press, ISBN 0674292103
- Bowen, William G.; Bok, Derek (2000) [1998], The Shape of the River: Long-Term Consequences of Considering Race in College and University Admissions, Princeton, NJ: Princeton University Press, ISBN 0691050198
- Bok, Derek (2001), The Trouble with Government, Cambridge, MA: Harvard University Press, ISBN 0674004485
- Bok, Derek (2003), Universities in the Marketplace: The Commercialization of Higher Education, Princeton, NJ: Princeton University Press, ISBN 0691114129
- Bok, Derek (2008) [2006], Our Underachieving Colleges: A Candid Look at How Much Students Learn and Why They Should Be Learning More, Princeton, NJ: Princeton University Press, ISBN 9780691136189
- Bok, Derek (2010), The Politics of Happiness: What Government can Learn from the New Research on Well-Being, Princeton, NJ: Princeton University Press, ISBN 9781400832194
- Bok, Derek (2017), The Struggle to Reform Our Colleges, Princeton, NJ: Princeton University Press, ISBN 9780691177472

Academic offices
Preceded by Nathan M. Pusey	President of Harvard University; 1971–1991	Succeeded by Neil L. Rudenstine
Preceded by Lawrence H. Summers	President of Harvard University acting 1 July 2006–30 June 2007	Succeeded by Drew Gilpin Faust
Preceded by Erwin Griswold	Dean of Harvard Law School; 1968–1971	Succeeded by Albert Sacks
