= Ezra Ripley Thayer =

American lawyer (1866–1915)

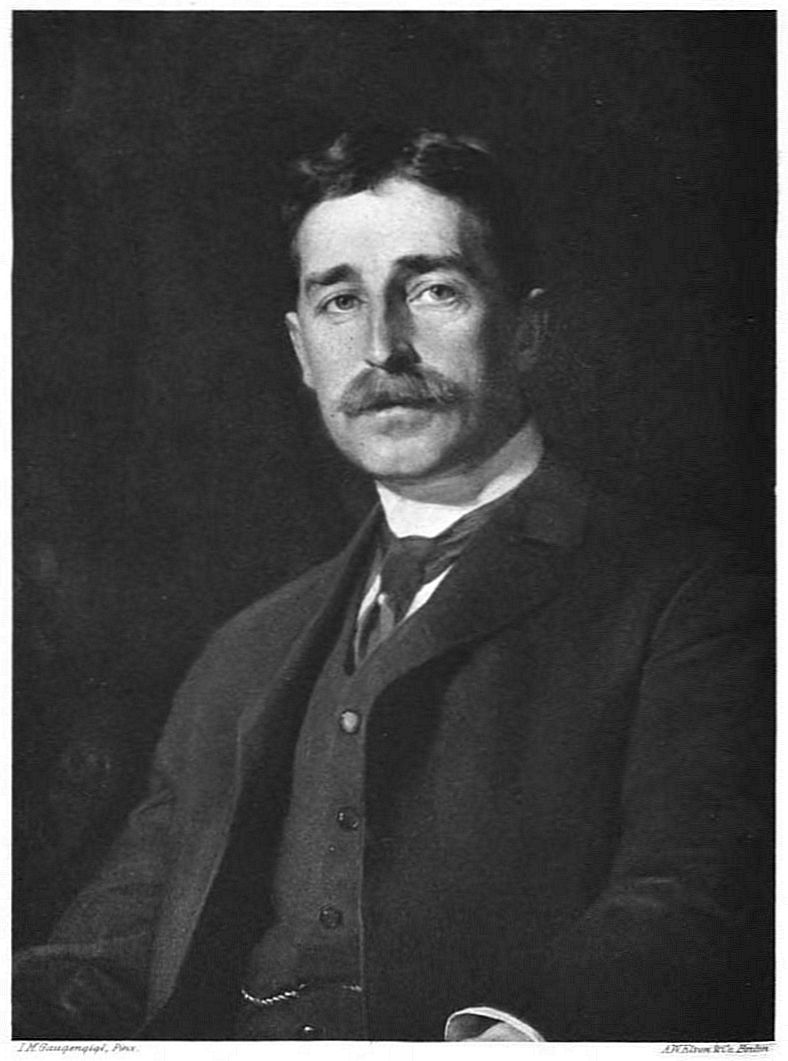
- Thayer c. 1910

3rd Dean of Harvard Law School
- In office 1910 – September 14, 1915
- Preceded by: James Barr Ames
- Succeeded by: Roscoe Pound

Personal details
- Born: February 21, 1866 Milton, Massachusetts, U.S.
- Died: September 14, 1915 (aged 49) Cambridge, Massachusetts, U.S.
- Resting place: Hingham Center Cemetery, Hingham, Massachusetts
- Spouse: Ethel Randolph Clark (m. 1898-1915; his death)
- Children: 3, including Polly
- Education: Harvard University (AB, LLB)
- Occupation: Attorney, professor

Ezra Ripley Thayer (February 21, 1866 – September 14, 1915) was an attorney, Dane Professor of Law, and the dean of Harvard Law School from 1910 to 1915.

== Early life ==
Ezra Ripley Thayer was born in Milton, Massachusetts on February 21, 1866 to Harvard Law School professor James Bradley Thayer, and Sophia Bradford (Ripley) Thayer. His oldest brother William Sydney Thayer became a professor of medicine. He attended public schools in Cambridge, Massachusetts, and studied abroad with a tutor for a year in Athens, Greece. Upon his return, he entered Harvard College with the class of 1888. After graduation, Thayer attended Harvard Law School, where he graduated with an LL.B. in 1891.

He married Ethel Randolph Clark on June 23, 1898 and had three children: James Bradley Thayer (1899–1976), Eleanor Arnold Thayer (1902–1923), and Polly (1904–2006).

== Law career ==
Thayer served as Secretary to Justice Horace Gray, U.S. Supreme Court in 1892. He practiced law in Boston with the firm of Brandeis, Dunbar, and Nutter from 1893–1900. Then, from 1900–1910 he moved to the Boston firm of Storey, Thorndike, Palmer and Thayer.

In 1910, Thayer was appointed as Dean of Harvard Law School, succeeding James Barr Ames, who had died in January of that year. In 1913, he declined an offer to be appointed to the Supreme Judicial Court of Massachusetts.

Suffering from acute depression, he is thought to have committed suicide at the age of 49. After two days of being missing, his body was found in the Charles River.

== Connection to Cole Porter ==
Cole Porter, the famous American songwriter, was enrolled in Harvard Law School in 1913. Porter did not take to the study of law. Porter met with Thayer, who was Dean at the time. Thayer suggested that Porter should switch schools and instead enroll at Harvard's music school, which was obviously Porter's true calling. Porter took Thayer's advice and secretly transferred to the music program.

== See also ==
- List of law clerks for the second seat of the Supreme Court of the United States

Academic offices
Preceded by James Barr Ames	Dean of Harvard Law School; 1910–1915	Succeeded by Roscoe Pound
