= Polly Thayer Starr =

American painter, Quaker, and philanthropist

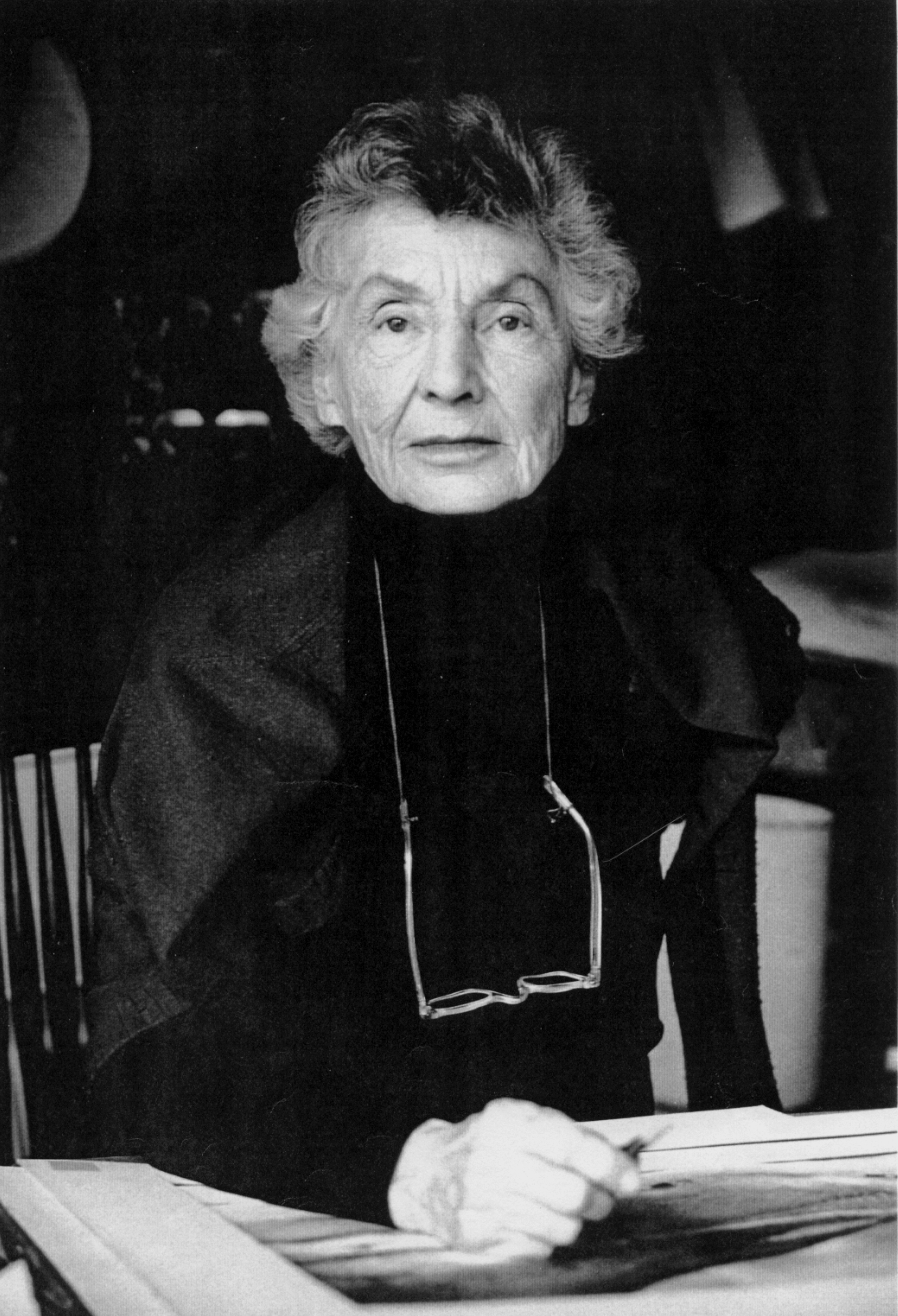
Photographic portrait of Boston artist Polly Thayer (Starr), by Boston artist Steven Trefonides

Polly Thayer (Starr) (born Ethel Randolph Thayer; November 8, 1904 – August 30, 2006) was an American painter and pastel artist. When she was still in her twenties she became known for portraits and figure compositions in the tradition of the Boston School, but took a more Modernist approach after completing her training. She became increasingly interested in conveying the invisible essences of landscape, flowers and living creatures as her career developed, and she was noted for the skilled draftsmanship that provided the substructure of her work.

== Biography ==
=== Background ===
Named Ethel Randolph Thayer after her mother, Polly Thayer was born on November 8, 1904, the daughter of Ezra Ripley Thayer, an attorney who was dean of Harvard Law School from 1910 to 1915, and Ethel Randolph Thayer, and the granddaughter of legal scholar James Bradley Thayer. She was born into a wealthy and distinguished family, "of the best New England ancestry", and when she came of age the Boston Post called her "one of the Back Bay's foremost society girls".

Although she signed some of her early paintings Ethel Thayer, she had been known as Polly since childhood, and by the end of the 1920s generally signed her work Polly Thayer. She continued to use Polly Thayer as her brush name after she was married, although in 1967 she changed her name legally from Ethel Randolph Starr to Polly Thayer Starr. Toward the end of her career she identified herself professionally as Polly Thayer (Starr), but never used that name to sign her work.

=== Education ===
Thayer attended Winsor School in Boston and showed an early aptitude for drawing which her mother encouraged by arranging for her to take after-school lessons with Beatrice Van Ness, who had been a student of Benson, Tarbell and Philip L. Hale. She transferred to Westover School in Middlebury, Connecticut, and after graduation embarked with her mother and brother on a tour of the Far East, where they witnessed the Great Kantō earthquake of 1923, an event she viewed as a turning point in her perception of life.

That autumn Thayer entered the School of the Museum of Fine Arts, Boston, where she studied figure drawing with Hale and portrait painting with Leslie Prince Thompson for about a year and a half, when she left to study privately with Hale. While still under Hale's tutelage she painted a large nude, Circles, which in 1929 was awarded the National Academy of Design's Julius Hallgarten Prize. She also studied in 1924 with Charles W. Hawthorne, who “keyed up the palette a lot” with his outdoor classes in Provincetown.

Royal Cortissoz, the conservative art critic of the New York Herald Tribune encouraged her to visit Europe and learn from the master artists of the past. He feared that she might otherwise become just another society portraitist of the Boston School. Thayer traveled to Spain in 1930 and became particularly fascinated with Goya before continuing her studies in France. She rented the studio-apartment of Waldo Pierce in Paris, where she worked while attending life drawing classes at the studio of André Lhote. In later years she studied with Harry Wickey at the Art Students League of New York; Jean Despujols at the École des Beaux-Arts, Fontainebleau; Carl Nelson in Boston; and Hans Hofmann in Provincetown.

=== Career ===
She won recognition as a "major talent" in 1929 when her large female nude won the Hallgarten Prize at the National Academy of Design's annual show in New York City. It was thoroughly conservative and critics approved its lack of anything associated with modernism. Only its enigmatic title, Circles, directed the viewer's attention to the background of freely painted geometric figures.

Thayer's first solo exhibition opened on December 31, 1930, at Doll & Richards in Boston. It was so well received that the Boston Globe art critic wrote that it "surely settles her status as one of the foremost painters in the country”. It brought her commissions for eighteen portraits, many of which she exhibited at Wildenstein's in New York City the following year. Questioned about her ambitions in 1932, she said she needed to complete her education in the classical tradition, but then hoped to "look into this thing called modernism" and eventually "paint imaginative things".

Among the galleries that later gave her solo shows were the Sessler Gallery in Philadelphia; Contemporary Arts and Pietrantonio Galleries in New York; and in Boston the Guild of Boston Artists, Grace Horne Galleries, Child's Gallery, The Copley Society, the St. Botolph Club and the Boston Public Library.

She began a series of landscape paintings which were characterized by D. Rhodes Johnson as "the work of a folk artist with technical training...It has the freshness of the conception of a primitive, but is never out of drawing". The 1936 portrait of May Sarton in the Harvard Art Museums, evinces a different aspect of this new freedom of expression, as Thayer found herself experimenting with portraiture unconstrained by tonal values.

As a tribute to her talent and reputation, the Boston Society of Independent Artists purchased one of these landscapes, My Childhood Trees, and donated it to the Boston Museum of Fine Arts in 1940, a time when that institution was granting only tentative recognition to modernism.

=== Personal life ===
Thayer met Donald C. Starr (1901–1992), (Note: Starr was a graduate of Phillips Andover Academy (1918), Harvard College (1922), and Harvard Law School (1925).) a school friend of her brother James (Note: Her brother James Bradley Thayer (1899–1976) was a scholar of Roman law, who is sometimes confused with his namesake and grandfather, who was a pre-eminent scholar of American law.) at Harvard, in the early 1920s. After a long period of indecision as Thayer wondered how marriage would affect her work as an artist, they made plans to marry in Boston. But first, having resigned his position as an Assistant Attorney General of Massachusetts, Starr was about to circumnavigate the globe by sail before settling upon a career. He set out with a small group of like-minded adventurers on his schooner Pilgrim on June 21, 1932. Impatient for home after 17 months, (Note: "There comes a time in every cruise when home is no longer the port you left behind so much as the port you are returning to. With the halfway meridian passed, that time had come.") Starr interrupted his sailing journey in Singapore on November 17, 1933, and continued west on a Dutch steamer through the Suez Canal to Genoa, where he and Thayer wed in a civil ceremony. They honeymooned in Paris. He rejoined the schooner when it reached Nice late in March 1934, as Thayer took a steamer from Villefranche to Boston. Starr then crossed the Atlantic in the Pilgrim, reaching Boston where his new wife welcomed him home in July 1934. Thayer never took to sailing, but it remained one of Starr's passions. Late in life she said: "He had webbed feet–always had to get on a boat."

The Starrs had two daughters, Victoria and Dinah, the first born in 1940. In 1942 Thayer joined the Society of Friends (Quakers), which became an important part of her life and identity. She took an active interest in many educational, charitable and cultural institutions, among them the Boston Public Library and the Institute of Contemporary Art, and she was especially devoted to the causes of peace and non-violence. She also joined the Nucleus and the Tuesday Club, which met to discuss topics of current interest. The spirit of some of those meetings is preserved in small sketches she made while she listened.

Family life combined with her Quaker commitments to crowd out her artistic efforts, a situation she recognized and spoke freely about. Though she showed a lower profile, she enjoyed six solo exhibitions between the birth of her first child in 1940 and the loss of her vision in the 1990s. She continued her work in portraiture, while her more private pursuits included explorations into the nature of landscape, flowers and animals, especially cats, always seeking to reveal their essential being. "The only way I can see or understand is that of through the visible to the invisible reality", she commented.

Early in her career, she worked winters at her home in Boston and summers at Weir River Farm in Hingham.

=== Later years ===
Thayer had long been fascinated by the dynamics, meaning and variety of visual experience. In 1981 the Friends Journal published her essay “On Seeing,” a paper she continued to refine until she was ninety-seven, and around the same time she learned that she had glaucoma, which was later complicated by macular degeneration. Increasingly aware of the fragility of her vision, she concentrated on lavish pastels of gladiolas with their bees and an increasingly abstract sequence of cyclamen flowers drawn in chalk on black paper with touches of color, as well as delicate series of graphite drawings based on the life cycle of the thistle. In 1992 she completed her last major work, a charcoal self-portrait which is notable for the luminosity of one side of her face and the darkness of the other. Between the time she became unable to practice her craft and her death in 2006, the stature of her work was recognized in eleven solo exhibitions.

In 2001 she was the only living artist included in the Boston Museum of Fine Arts exhibition, "A Studio of Her Own", and a banner of her portrait of May Sarton hung over the entrance to the Museum.

She died at her home in Lexington, Massachusetts, on August 30, 2006. Two memorials services followed, one in an Episcopal church and the other in a Quaker meeting house. She is buried with her husband in Hingham Center Cemetery. The tombstone inscription draws on her insistence on the importance of seeing: "The gloom of the world is but a shadow. Behind it, yet within our reach, is joy. There is radiance and glory in the darkness, could we but see..."

The bulk of her papers were deposited at the Smithsonian. Some of her Tuesday Club sketches are held by the Arthur and Elizabeth Schlesinger Library on the History of Women in America. An extensive correspondence between Thayer and Sarton is preserved in the Berg Collection of the New York Public Library.

== Notable works ==
- Circles, c. 1928 "This particular picture seemed like a challenge to the distortionists, whose work usually required considerable literary subtlety and aimless phraseology by way of explanation. That picture didn’t have to be explained. Here was the healthy body of a young woman, done to the life. It was honest.”
- In Thayer's self-portrait The Algerian Tunic, c. 1927, "she gazes at the viewer directly, and she holds her brush in midair, just about to use it. Thayer's evident intellectual curiosity led her to explore a modern vocabulary in her later work, leaving behind the more traditional approach of many Boston painters."
- Miss May Sarton (1936) "documents the friendship of an artist and a sitter who have made significant contributions to American culture. [It was] purchased nearly fifty years ago by Paul J. Sachs, then the associate director of the Fogg Art Museum, and lent to the sitter with the proviso that it eventually be donated to the Fogg." “May Sarton, which is splendid in color and an absolutely painterly presentation, is drawn with a special kind of nervous understanding. It comes off as few modern portraits do.”
- "My Childhood Trees", c. 1938, "became one of fewer than ten paintings in the Museum's American collection at that time that could be characterized as modern (even including the Ashcan School) and it was the first one to have been painted by a Boston artist."
- Boston Globe critic Sebastian Smee commented of Shopping for Furs that "The bored, dispirited face of Thayer’s anonymous sitter is unlike anything I’ve ever seen in art: self-possession, deep exhaustion, and a longing for release all rolled into one... The jaunty hat and dangling left hand, meanwhile, communicate splendid insouciance"
- Soldiers, 1944: Asked in her later years to identify some of her most treasured work, Thayer replied: “During World War II, I went out nightly to the Officers’ Club in Boston to do pencil drawings of the young men, which I gave to them... The soldiers came from all over the country, passing through Boston on their way to being shipped out. The poignancy of those young men who were going to war, who might never see the year out, had something to do with those drawings.”
- Iris, "created in a seamless blend of watercolor and pastel, is a master work where color seems to unite form and space into a shifting composition. Some areas of the flower appear solid and real; in other areas the gossamer petals seem to be theoretical, as if composed of form and space or of a luminous atmosphere.”.
