= John C. P. Goldberg =

American legal scholar (born 1961)

John Goldberg

14th Dean of Harvard Law School
- Incumbent
- Assumed office March 14, 2024; Acting: March 14, 2024 – June 30, 2025
- Preceded by: John F. Manning

Personal details
- Born: John Carlo Paul Goldberg; October 10, 1961 (age 64)
- Education: Wesleyan University (BA); St Antony's College, Oxford (MPhil); Princeton University (MA); New York University (JD)

John Carlo Paul Goldberg (born October 10, 1961) is an American legal scholar who has been the dean of Harvard Law School since 2024. He was previously the Carter Professor of General Jurisprudence at Harvard.

== Early life and education ==
Goldberg was born to a Jewish family. He received a Bachelor of Arts from the College of Social Studies at Wesleyan University in 1983. He then attended St Antony's College, Oxford, and obtained a Master of Philosophy in politics in 1985. In 1989, Goldberg received a Master of Arts from Princeton University in politics and then a Juris Doctor from the New York University School of Law, where he was editor-in-chief of the New York University Law Review.

Goldberg clerked for Judge Jack B. Weinstein of the United States District Court for the Eastern District of New York and Justice Byron White at the U.S. Supreme Court.

== Academic career ==
Goldberg was a professor at the Vanderbilt University Law School and was appointed as its associate dean for research. He joined the faculty of Harvard Law School in 2008, serving as its deputy-dean from 2017 to 2022. Goldberg served as the acting dean of Harvard Law School in place of John F. Manning from March 2024 to August 2024, and as interim dean following Manning's August 2024 appointment as provost of Harvard and resignation from the deanship. On June 30, 2025, Goldberg was officially appointed dean of Harvard Law School.

Goldberg is an elected member of the American Law Institute. Goldberg also serves on the editorial board of the Journal of Tort Law, where he was editor in chief from 2009 to 2015, and is currently co-editor-in-chief of the Journal of Legal Analysis. Goldberg is a co-author of the casebook Tort Law: Responsibilities and Redress.
