= James Vorenberg =

American legal scholar (1928–2000)

9th Dean of Harvard Law School
- In office 1981–1989
- Preceded by: Albert Sacks
- Succeeded by: Robert C. Clark

Personal details
- Born: October 1, 1928 Boston, Massachusetts, U.S.
- Died: April 12, 2000 (aged 71) Boston, Massachusetts, U.S.
- Education: Harvard University (BA, JD)

James Vorenberg (October 1, 1928 – April 12, 2000) was the Roscoe Pound Professor of Law and Dean of Harvard Law School, former Watergate Associate Special Prosecutor, and first chair of the Massachusetts State Ethics Commission.

== Biography ==
Born in Boston, Massachusetts, Vorenberg attended Harvard College, from which he graduated magna cum laude with a Bachelor of Arts degree in 1948, and Harvard Law School, from which he earned a Juris Doctor degree in 1951. In his first year at Harvard Law School, he achieved the highest grades in his class and was awarded the Sears Prize. He served as the president of the Harvard Law Review while attending the school. In 1953, he clerked for Justice Felix Frankfurter at the U.S. Supreme Court.

Vorenberg became a professor at Harvard Law School in 1962. In 1973, he served as principal assistant to Archibald Cox in the Watergate Special Prosecutor's Office. He served as chairman of the Massachusetts State Ethics Commission from 1978 to 1983. In 1981, he was elected to the Common Cause National Governing Board. He was named associate dean at Harvard Law in 1977 and was named dean and Roscoe Pound Professor of Law in 1981. He retired at the end of June 1989. "I've tried to encourage students to follow diverse, varied patterns out of law school," Vorenberg told The New York Times in 1989.

Vorenberg and Jack Greenberg, Dean of Columbia College, wrote Dean Cuisine, a cookbook that The New York Times reviewed in 1991, saying: "a modest tome that should be required reading for all those tiresome people who say they never cook anymore.

Vorenberg suffered from Parkinson's disease during his final 14 years. He died of cardiac arrest in Boston on April 12, 2000.

== See also ==
- List of law clerks for the second seat of the Supreme Court of the United States

Academic offices
Preceded by Albert Martin Sacks	Dean of Harvard Law School; 1981–1989	Succeeded by Robert C. Clark
