= Curtis Bok =

American judge

W. Curtis Bok
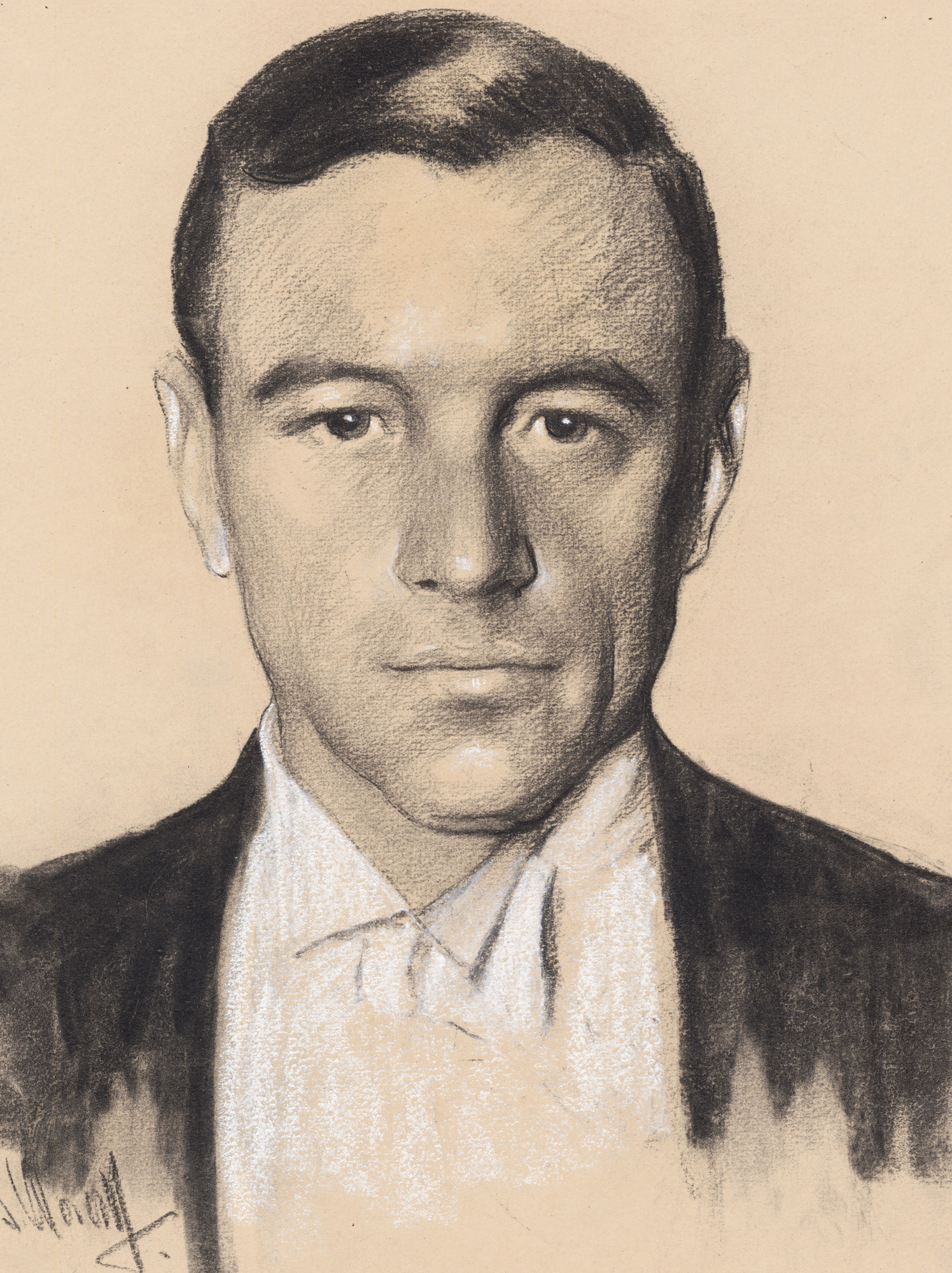
- Time magazine cover, July 17, 1933

Justice of the Pennsylvania Supreme Court
- In office 1958 – May 22, 1962

Personal details
- Born: William Curtis Bok; September 7, 1897
- Died: May 22, 1962 (aged 64)
- Spouse(s): Margaret Plummer (m. 1924, div. 1933); Nellie Lee Holt (m. 1934 - 1962, his death)
- Children: 5, including Derek Bok

William Curtis Bok (September 7, 1897 – May 22, 1962) was a Pennsylvania Supreme Court justice, philanthropist and writer. He and his brother were heirs to an enormous publishing fortune. Curtis Bok was also a devout Quaker, a published novelist and an avid sailor.

== Early life ==
W. Curtis Bok was born in Wyncote, Pennsylvania, a suburb of Philadelphia. His father was Edward Bok, a Dutch immigrant to the United States and editor-in-chief of The Ladies Home Journal. His mother was Mary Louise Curtis, the only child and heir of Cyrus H. K. Curtis, founder of the Curtis Publishing Company. Bok's father won the 1920 Pulitzer Prize for biography; his mother founded the Curtis Institute of Music.

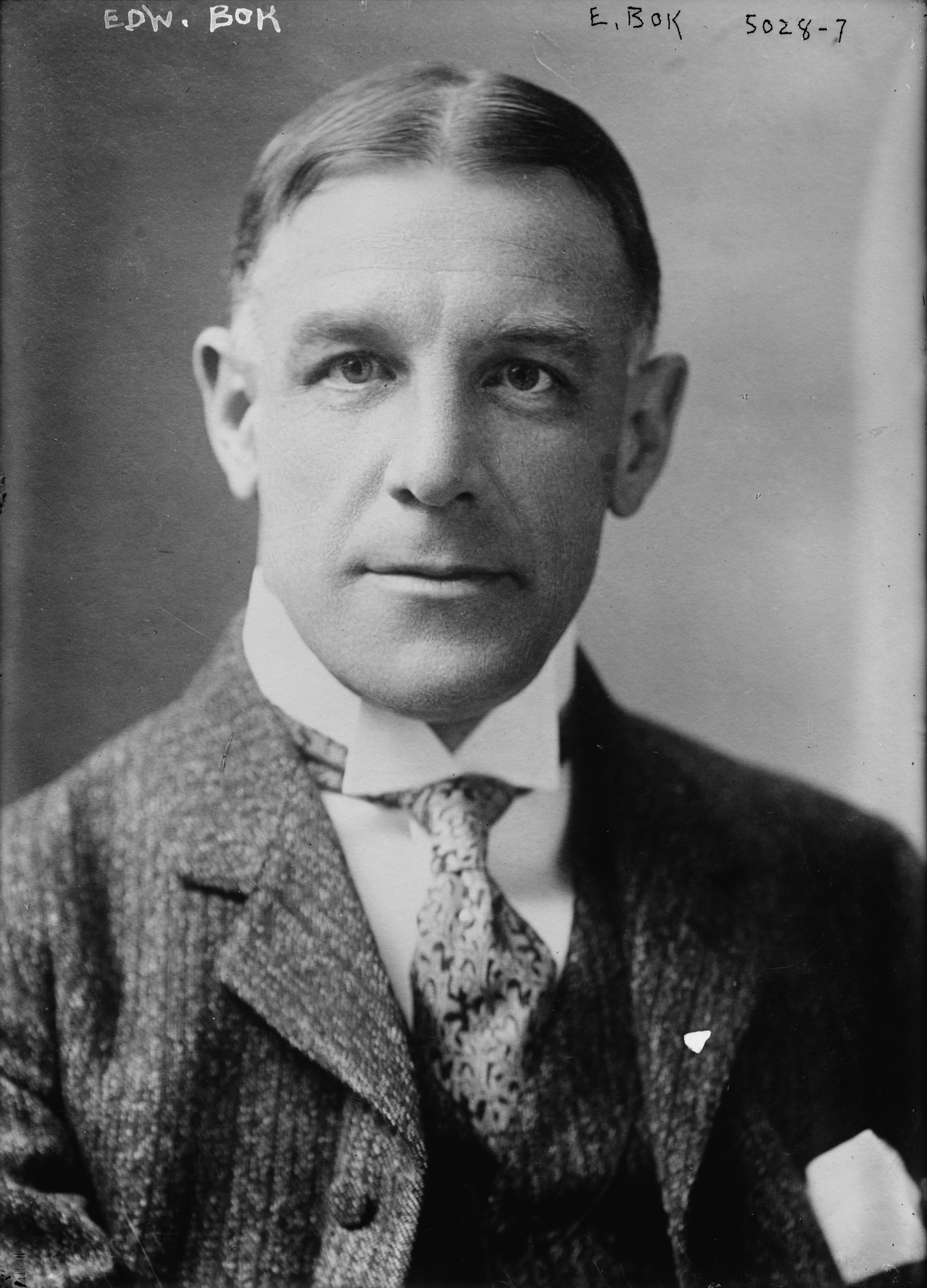
Edward W. Bok (1863–1930)

Bok was a sickly child, with a weak heart. Edward Bok wrote a touching essay about taking his son to the White House to meet the son's hero, President Theodore Roosevelt.

In 1915, Bok graduated from The Hill School in Pottstown, Pennsylvania. He attended Williams College in Williamstown, Massachusetts, but left to serve in the U.S. Navy during World War I. He returned to finish his degree at Williams, and graduated from the University of Virginia School of Law in 1921.

== Career ==
Bok worked on several public service projects before forming a law partnership with Robert Dechert and Owen B. Rhodes in 1930. He served as an assistant district attorney in Philadelphia, 1929–1932, and ran unsuccessfully for Philadelphia district attorney in 1935. Appointed an Orphans Court judge the following year, he became president judge of the Court of Common Pleas for Philadelphia County in 1937.

His most famous opinion was on obscenity in literature — Commonwealth of Pennsylvania v. Gordon et al., Court of Quarter Sessions, Philadelphia, June 1948. In March 1948, the Philadelphia vice squad raided 54 booksellers, confiscating works by authors such as Erskine Caldwell, James T. Farrell, William Faulkner, and Calder Willingham. In an elegantly written opinion, Bok found that the books were "obvious efforts to show life as it is", and that Pennsylvania could not censor them:

It will be asked whether one would care to have one's young daughter read these books. I suppose that by the time she is old enough to wish to read them she will have learned the biologic facts of life and the words that go with them. There is something seriously wrong at home if those facts have not been met and faced and sorted by then; it is not children so much as parents that should receive our concern about this. I should prefer that my own three daughters meet the facts of life and the literature of the world in my library than behind a neighbor's barn, for I can face the adversary there directly. If the young ladies are appalled by what they read, they can close the book at the bottom of page one; if they read further, they will learn what is in the world and in its people, and no parents who have been discerning with their children need fear the outcome. Nor can they hold it back, for life is a series of little battles and minor issues, and the burden of choice is on us all, every day, young and old.

In 1958, Bok was elected a justice of the Pennsylvania Supreme Court, serving until his death in 1962.

=== Philanthropy ===
Bok served as president of the Philadelphia Orchestra Association, but resigned in 1941 after his board forced the resignation of conductor Leopold Stokowski. He was treasurer of the Curtis Institute of Music, and founded the Philadelphia Forum, a cultural boosterism group that sponsored lectures, concerts and art exhibits. He was a member of the Committee of Seventy, a Philadelphia watchdog organization that promoted good government.

He directed his father's American Foundation, which promoted world peace. A supporter of presidential candidate Franklin Delano Roosevelt's efforts to normalize relations between the United States and the Soviet Union, Bok made a two-month tour of Russia in 1932, then stayed on for three additional months, working in a factory and as a chauffeur. He wrote an idealistic book about life in the Socialist Republic, which landed him on the July 17, 1933, cover of Time Magazine.

=== Writings ===
Bok wrote many legal opinions and made contributions to law journals. His first three novels were courtroom dramas. He was a strong opponent of capital punishment and, in Star Wormwood (1959), used the most heinous crime imaginable to argue that it was still unjustified. Bok was an avid sailor, and twice sailed a 42-foot ketch across the Atlantic Ocean. His final novel was a romance in which a sailor on a lone voyage reads a love letter each day.

==== Non-fiction ====
- The United States and the Soviet Union (New York: The American Foundation, 1933)
- American Medicine Expert Testimony Out of Court (New York: The American Foundation, 1937)
- Commonwealth v. Gordon et al, the Opinion of Judge Bok, March 18, 1949 (San Francisco: The Grabhorn Press, 1949)
- Freedom of the Press (Philadelphia: 1950)
- Civil Liberties under Attack (Philadelphia: University of Pennsylvania Press, 1951).
- Religion in Law (Philadelphia: 1953)

==== Fiction ====
- Backbone of the Herring (New York: Alfred A. Knopf, 1941)
- I, Too, Nicodemus (New York: Alfred A. Knopf, 1946)
- Star Wormwood (New York: Alfred A. Knopf, 1959)
- Maria: A Tale of the Northeast Coast (New York: Alfred A. Knopf, 1962).

== Personal life ==
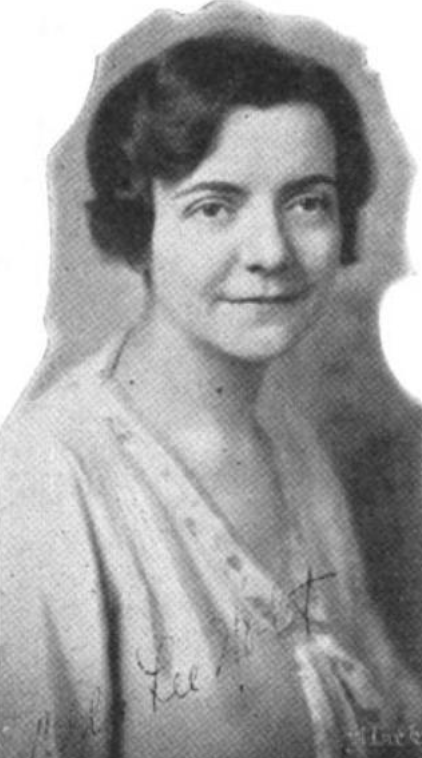
Nellie Lee Holt, circa 1930

Bok had one sibling, Cary W. Bok (1905–1970), who tried unsuccessfully to run the Curtis Publishing Company in its final years. The younger brother settled in Camden, Maine.

On May 25, 1924, Bok married Margaret (Peggy) Adams Plummer (1904–1994). They had three children: Margaret Welmoet Bok Roland Holst (1925–1998), Benjamin Plummer Bok (1926–2001), and Derek Curtis Bok (1930– ). The marriage ended in divorce in 1933.

On November 25, 1934, Bok married Nellie Lee Holt (1901–1984), the director of religious education at Stephens College for Women in Columbia, Missouri, and a peace activist who had studied with Mahatma Gandhi. They had two daughters, Rachel Bok Kise Goldman (1937– ) and Enid Curtis Bok Schoettle Okun (1939–2018).

W. Curtis Bok died in May 1962, and was interred at West Laurel Hill Cemetery in Bala Cynwyd, Pennsylvania. Nellie Lee Holt Bok died twenty-two years later, and was interred beside him.

=== Curtis Bok House ===
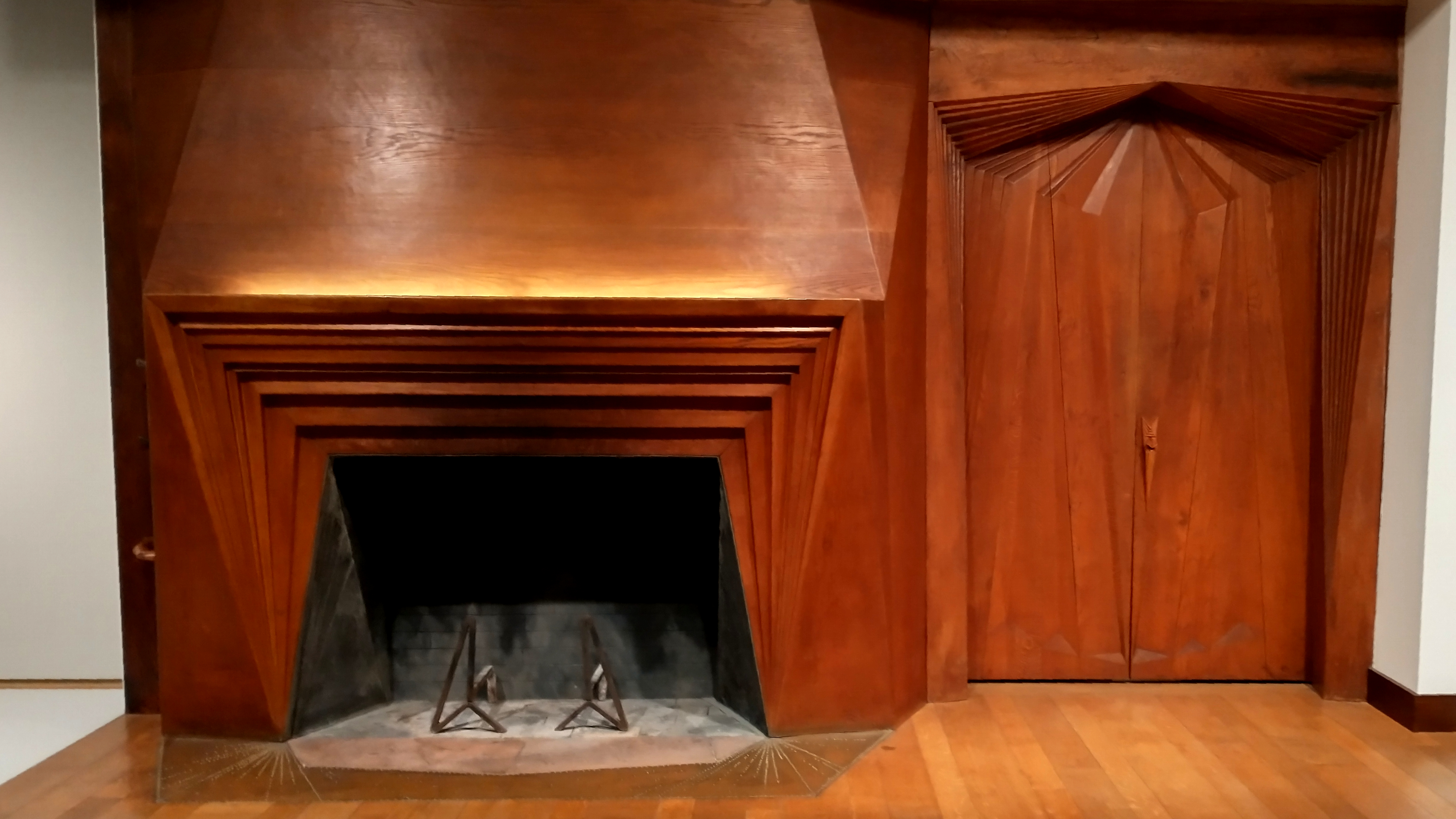
Wharton Esherick, Curtis Bok House Fireplace and Doorway (1935-38), Philadelphia Museum of Art.

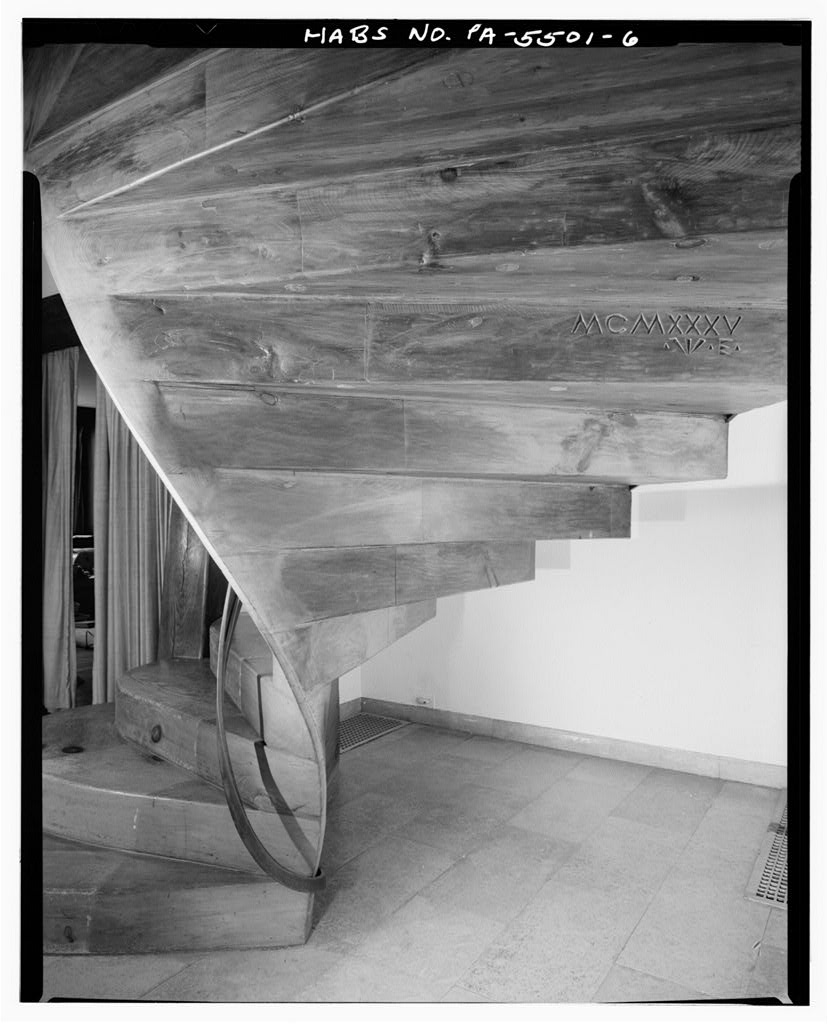
Wharton Esherick, Curtis Bok House Spiral Staircase (1935-38), Wolfsonian-FIU Museum, Miami Beach, Florida

Soon after their wedding, Curtis and Nellie Lee Bok purchased a country house at 120 Upper Gulph Road in Gulph Mills, Pennsylvania. They added a rear wing, with an "L"-shaped library and a music room on the first floor, and bedrooms above. All the new rooms featured hand-crafted interiors and furniture by Wharton Esherick (1935–1938). The house was demolished in 1989, to build a townhouse development.

Interiors and furniture from the Curtis Bok House are in the collections of the Philadelphia Museum of Art, the Wharton Esherick Museum, the Wolfsonian-FIU Museum in Miami Beach, Florida, and elsewhere.

=== Legacy ===
Swarthmore College awarded Bok an honorary Doctor of Letters in 1960. Jerome J. Shestack, a friend and legal colleague, wrote of him: "His deep and abiding sympathy for the human condition was the hallmark both of his courtroom and of his life."

W. Curtis Bok's papers are housed at Princeton University and the Historical Society of Pennsylvania.

His son, Derek Curtis Bok, served as dean of Harvard Law School, 1968–71, and president of Harvard University, 1971–91 and 2006–07.
