= William Sydney Thayer =

American physician and educator (1864–1932)

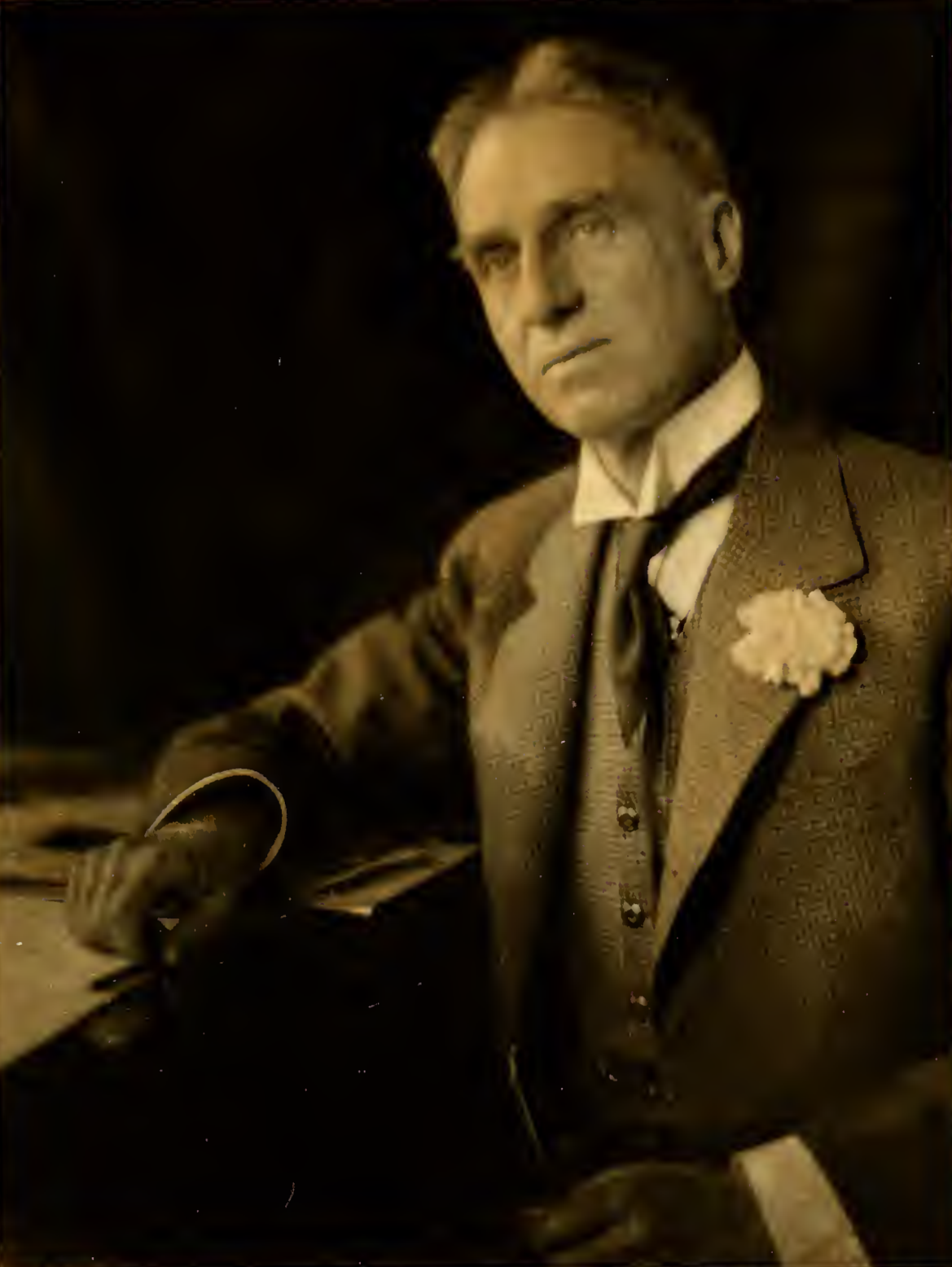
- Thayer in 1922 publication
- Born: June 23, 1864; Milton, Massachusetts, U.S.
- Died: December 10, 1932 (aged 68)
- Education: Harvard University (BA)
- Spouse: Susan Chisolm Read (m. 1901)
- Relatives: Ezra Ripley Thayer (brother); Ralph Waldo Emerson (second cousin)

Signature
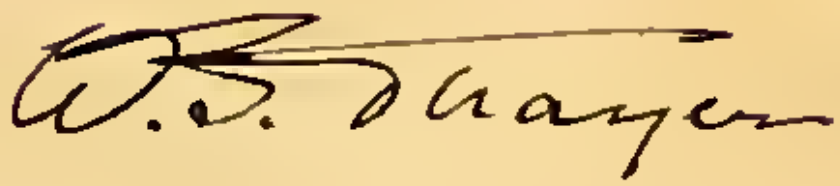

William Sydney Thayer (June 23, 1864 – December 10, 1932) was a physician and professor of medicine at the Johns Hopkins Hospital and Medical School. He was an acclaimed teacher of clinical practice and known as the clinician's clinician.

Thayer was born in Milton, Massachusetts, where his father James Bradley was a professor of law at Harvard University. His mother Sophia Ripley was a cousin of Ralph Waldo Emerson. A younger sibling, Ezra, became dean of the Harvard Law School. William was educated at Harvard University, receiving a BA degree in 1885 after being briefly suspended for a prank. He received a medical degree from Harvard in 1889. He then worked at the Massachusetts General Hospital and then went to Europe for further studies. He joined Johns Hopkins University School of Medicine in 1896 becoming a professor of clinical medicine in 1905. In 1917 he served with the American Expeditionary Forces in France. He also travelled through Russia via Canada and Japan as part of the Red Cross. He was an acclaimed teacher of medicine at Baltimore and also conducted research.

Thayer was elected to the American Academy of Arts and Sciences in 1921 and the American Philosophical Society in 1924.

Thayer married Susan Chisolm Read, a student of nursing from Johns Hopkins, in 1901.

== Other sources ==
- Reid, Edith Gittings (1936) The Life and convictions of William Sydney Thayer, physician. Oxford University Press.
