= Journal of Tort Law =

- Discipline: Tort law
- Language: English
- Edited by: Ellen Bublick and Greg Keating

Publication details
- History: 2006-present
- Publisher: De Gruyter, formerly Berkeley Electronic Press (United States, Germany)
- Frequency: Biannually

Standard abbreviations
- Bluebook: J. Tort L.
- ISO 4: J. Tort Law

Indexing
- ISSN: 1932-9148

Links
- Journal homepage

The Journal of Tort Law is a peer-reviewed law review covering tort law. The Journal of Tort Law was established in 2006. It was initially published online by the Berkeley Electronic Press and currently published by De Gruyter in print and online.

Founded by Jules Coleman (Yale), and formerly edited by John C. P. Goldberg and Christopher Robinette, its current editors are Ellen Bublick, from the Sandra Day O'Connor College of Law at Arizona State University, and Greg Keating from the USC Gould School of Law and the USC Department of Philosophy;. Bublick and Keating came to the Journal after serving as Torts Section Editors of the Torts JOTWELL Blog.

The Editorial Board members are Mark A. Geistfeld (NYU School of Law); John C.P. Goldberg (Harvard Law School); Ronen Perry (University of Haifa Faculty of Law); Christopher Robinette, Professor (Southwestern Law School); Catherine M. Sharkey (NYU School of Law); John Witt (Yale Law School); and Benjamin Zipursky (Fordham Law School). The Journal of Tort Law is the premier publisher of original articles about tort law, including articles by Guido Calabresi (Yale), Steve Shavell (Harvard), Deborah Hensler (Stanford), Ken Abraham and Ted White (Virginia), and many other luminaries.

The Journal of Tort Law is a peer-reviewed academic journal, committed to methodological pluralism. JTL publishes cutting-edge scholarship in tort theory and jurisprudence from a range of interdisciplinary perspectives: comparative, doctrinal, economic, empirical, historical, philosophical, and policy-oriented. JTL increasingly publishes international scholarship as well. Its citation impact has been independently ranked among the top-tier of American law journals. According to the Washington and Lee Law Journal Ranking, the Journal of Tort Law has the highest impact factor among 7 journals specializing in tort law and was overall ranked 64th among 1087 law journals in 2010. Moreover, JTL papers are available on Westlaw and can be posted on SSRN (as long as a cite to the full JTL article is also listed on the front page of the work).The journal is indexed in Index to Foreign Legal Periodicals, Intute, Scopus, and Westlaw.
