= Nellie Lee Holt Bok =

American philanthropist

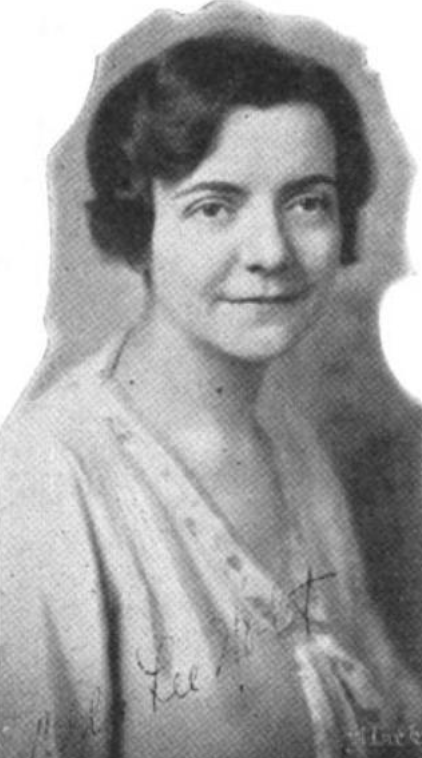
- Nellie Lee Holt (later Bok), from a 1930 publication
- Born: Nellie Lee Holt; February 1, 1901; Falls City, Nebraska, U.S.
- Died: October 7, 1984 (aged 83); Philadelphia, Pennsylvania, U.S.
- Occupations: Educator, socialite, philanthropist
- Spouse: W. Curtis Bok
- Relatives: Edward Bok (father-in-law); Mary Louise Curtis (mother-in-law); Derek Curtis Bok (stepson)

Nellie Lee Holt Bok (February 1, 1901 – October 7, 1984) was an American educator, writer, and philanthropist, based in Philadelphia. She taught at Stephens College in Missouri prior to her 1934 marriage to attorney W. Curtis Bok.

== Early life and education ==
Holt was born in Falls City, Nebraska, the daughter of William Robert Holt and Eva Lezetta Giannini Holt. She studied piano at the music conservatory at Saint Mary's College in Indiana, graduating in 1921. She earned a master's degree from the University of Nebraska.

== Career ==
Holt was a professor and chair of the religious education department at Stephens College in Columbia, Missouri, from 1925 to 1934. After attending the World Federation of Education Associations meeting in Edinburgh in 1926, she traveled the world studying youth movements, educational and religious institutions. She met with Havelock Ellis, Hermann von Keyserling, Rabindranath Tagore, William Ralph Inge, and Maude Royden during this project, and interviewed Gandhi during her stay in an Indian ashram. "Speaking with the freshness of youth on problems which are confronting members of her own generation," explained one profile, "Miss Holt is seeking out the truth as it is presented in the twentieth century."

She married attorney W. Curtis Bok in 1934, and moved to Philadelphia. In 1936. she gave a radio lecture in support of the re-election of Franklin D. Roosevelt. She was appointed to a seat on the Philadelphia County Board of Mothers' Assistance, Old Age Pension and Relief of the Blind. She resigned that position in 1937, the same year she attended the coronation of King George VI with her husband. In a 1942 "My Day" column, Eleanor Roosevelt mentioned staying with the Boks in Philadelphia. Holt-Bok helped to establish the Philadelphia Fellowship Commission, and was a member of the board of Philadelphia's Fellowship House during the 1940s.

In 1956, Curtis Bok was appointed president of his father's American Foundation, Inc. The foundation supported Mountain Lake Sanctuary in Florida, and education programs for prisoners. Sculptor Wharton Esherick created Art Deco furniture and interiors for the Boks' Gulph Mills home in the 1930s. Rachel Carson sought the Boks' advice on buying land for conservation.

== Publications ==
- "To a Rag-Doll", "The Song Fugitive", "To Mother", and "On Moderation" (1919, poems)
- "Roses and War" and "The Tale of an Apple" (1919, stories)
- "Portia and Nora: A Comparison" (1919, essay)
- "Sing!" and "To Chaucer" (1920, poems)
- "The Conqueror: Pride or Prejudice?" (1920, essay)
- "Arbat 26" (1928)
- "Young Artists of Living" (1929)
- "Prepare Students for Social Contacts" (1930)

== Personal life ==
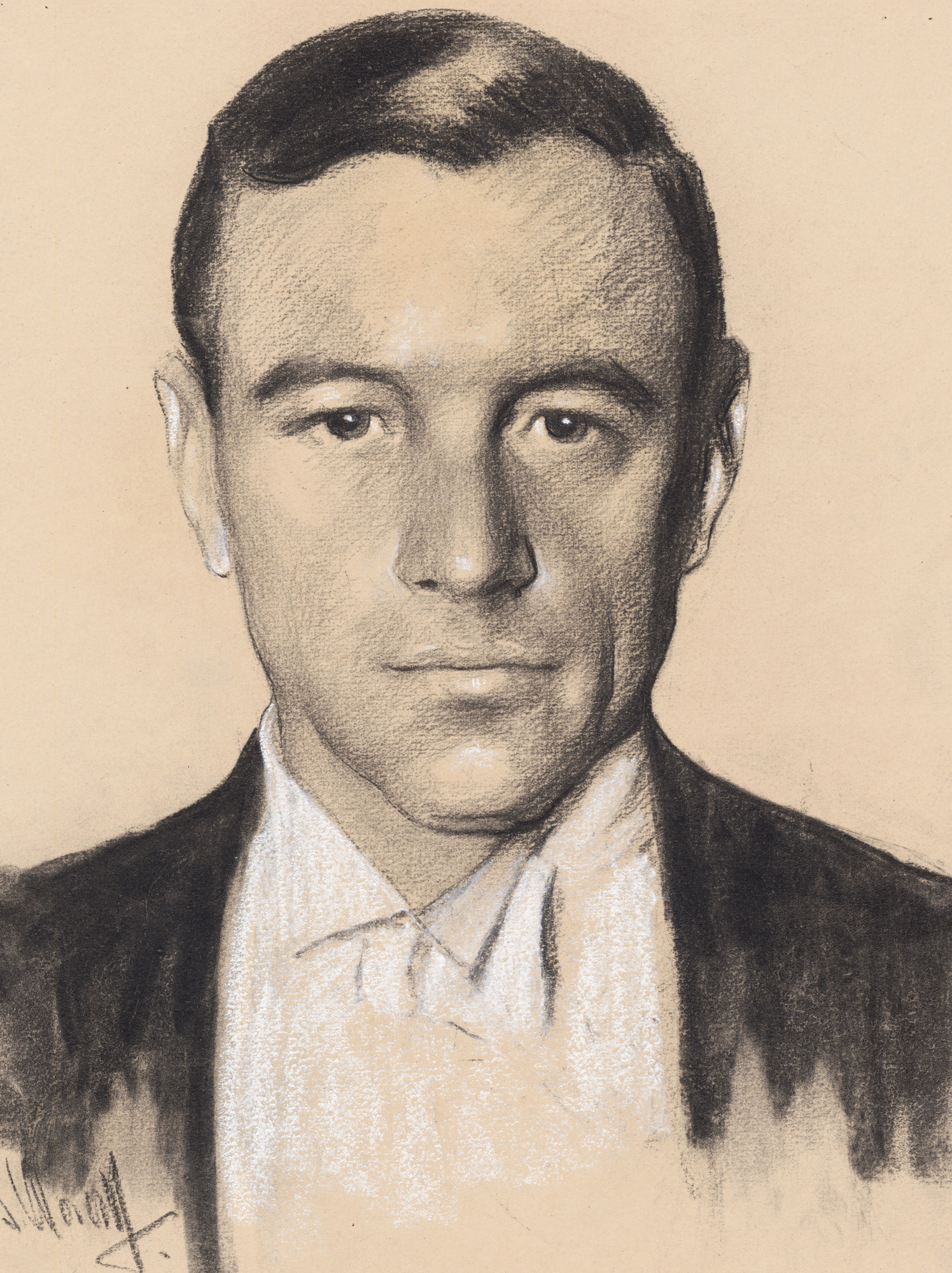
Charcoal portrait of Curtis Bok, age 35, cover of Time Magazine, July 17, 1933

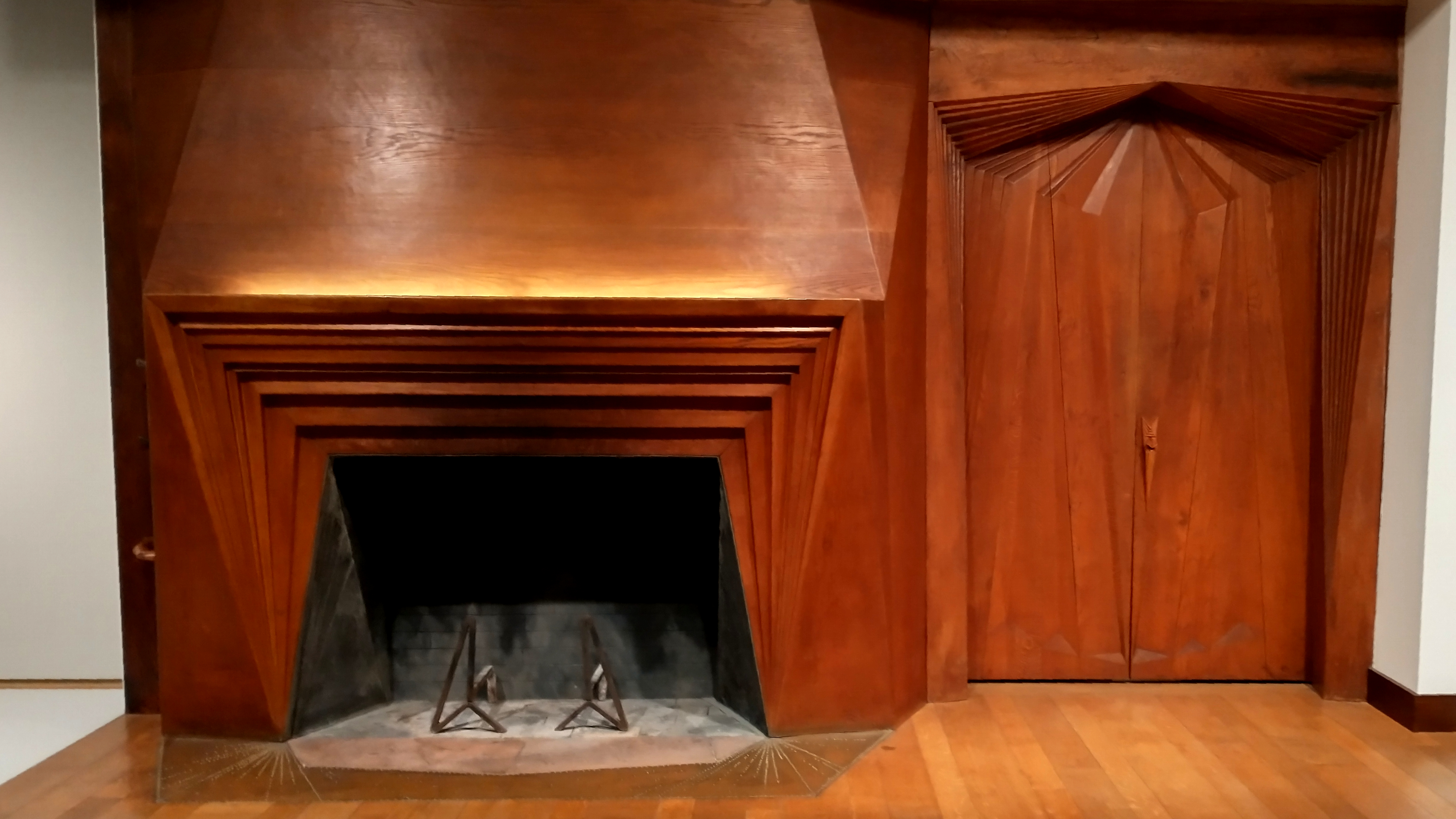
Wharton Esherick, Fireplace, andirons and Art Deco doorway (1935-38) from the Curtis Bok House in Gulph Mills, Pennsylvania (demolished 1989). Philadelphia Museum of Art

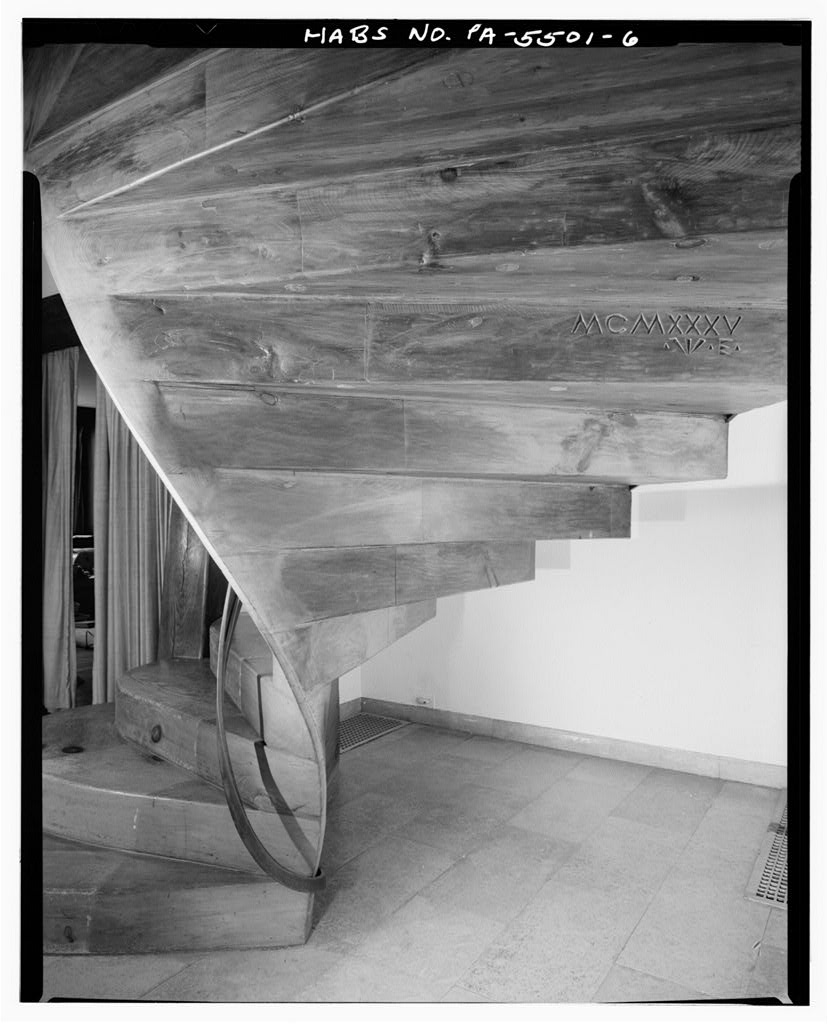
Wharton Esherick, Curtis Bok House Spiral Staircase (1935-38), Wolfsonian-FIU Museum, Miami Beach, Florida

Holt married Philadelphia attorney W. Curtis Bok in 1934, who was elected to the Supreme Court of Pennsylvania in 1958, where he served until his death. Holt was his second wife, and stepmother to the three children from his first marriage. Holt and Bok had two daughters together.

Justice W. Curtis Bok died in 1962, and Nellie Lee Holt Bok died in 1984, at age 83, in Philadelphia. Her papers and her husband's are in the collection of the Historical Society of Pennsylvania. Temple University has oral history interviews conducted with Nellie Lee Bok in 1979.
