= John F. Manning =

American legal academic (born 1961)

John Manning
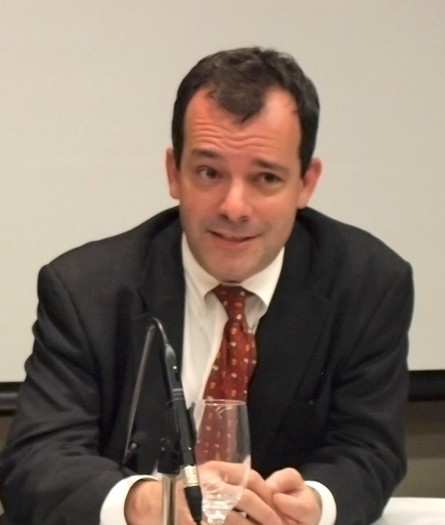
- Manning in 2009

7th Provost of Harvard University
- Incumbent
- Assumed office March 14, 2024
- Preceded by: Alan Garber

13th Dean of Harvard Law School
- In office July 1, 2017 – March 14, 2024
- Preceded by: Martha Minow
- Succeeded by: John C. P. Goldberg

Personal details
- Born: April 11, 1961 (age 65) Los Angeles, California, U.S.
- Education: Harvard University (BA, JD)

John Francis Manning (born April 11, 1961) is an American legal scholar who serves as the provost of Harvard University. He is the Dane Professor of Law at Harvard Law School (HLS), where he is a scholar of administrative and constitutional law. From 2017 to 2024, he was the 13th dean of Harvard Law School.

Manning received his undergraduate and legal education at Harvard University. After clerking for Judge Robert Bork and Justice Antonin Scalia, he was named the Michael I. Sovern Professor of Law at Columbia University. Manning moved to Harvard Law in 2002, becoming its deputy-dean, and assumed the deanship on July 1, 2017, succeeding Martha Minow.

== Early life and education ==
Manning was born on April 11, 1961, in Los Angeles, California. Because his mother, Sheila Manning, was a casting director, Manning worked occasionally as a child actor. He is Jewish. He matriculated at Harvard College, where he was a resident of Quincy House, as a history major. He graduated with a Bachelor of Arts, summa cum laude, in 1982 and was elected to Phi Beta Kappa. He was the first member of his family to graduate from college.

Manning then attended Harvard Law School, graduating magna cum laude with a Juris Doctor in 1985. Following law school, he served as a law clerk to Judge Robert Bork at the United States Court of Appeals for the District of Columbia Circuit from 1985 to 1986.

From 1986 to 1988, Manning was an attorney-advisor at the Office of Legal Counsel of the U.S. Department of Justice. He left to clerk for Justice Antonin Scalia at the Supreme Court of the United States during the 1988–1989 term. He was admitted to the bar of Pennsylvania in 1986, and to the bar of California in 1990.

== Academic career ==
In 1989, Manning became an associate attorney at the law firm of Gibson Dunn in Washington, D.C. He left the firm to serve as an assistant to the Solicitor General of the United States at the Justice Department from 1991 until 1994, when he began teaching at Columbia Law School, becoming the school's Michael I. Sovern Professor of Law.

Manning became a visiting professor at Harvard Law School in 2002, and was named a professor there in 2004. He was invited to join the law school by dean Elena Kagan as part of an effort to increase conservative members of the faculty. Manning's hiring came among a new series of public legal scholars, also including Jack Goldsmith and Adrian Vermeule. He received the school's appointment as its Bruce Bromley Professor of Law in 2007 and remained in that capacity until 2017. In 2013, he became the deputy-dean of Harvard Law School. After the University of Arizona's James E. Rogers College of Law began accepting Graduate Record Examinations (GRE) results for student admission in 2016, Manning influenced Harvard Law's decision to also accept the GRE for admission, which the school announced in March 2017.

Martha Minow, the 12th dean of HLS, announced her intention to retire from the deanship on January 5, 2017, at the end of the academic year. After a selection process conducted by Harvard president Drew Gilpin Faust and a faculty committee, it was announced on June 1, 2017, that Manning would serve as the next Dean of Harvard Law School. He assumed the position on July 1, 2017. His appointment to the role as Minow's successor was praised by former dean Elena Kagan, who had become an associate justice of the U.S. Supreme Court. It was also endorsed by Danielle Allen, director of the Edmond J. Safra Center for Ethics, and Judge David J. Barron of the United States Court of Appeals for the First Circuit. Affinity groups on campus had opposed Manning's appointment, and they instead supported David B. Wilkins.

Manning is an authority in administrative law and structural constitutional law, and has argued nine cases before the Supreme Court. Manning is also an expert on issues concerning separation of powers. He teaches administrative law, federal courts, legislation and regulation, separation of powers, and statutory interpretation. He was the co-editor of two notable casebooks: Hart and Wechsler’s Federal Courts and the Federal System (Note: Manning was editor of the 6th edition, 2009, with Richard H. Fallon Jr., Daniel Meltzer, and David I. Shapiro.) as well as Legislation and Regulation. (Note: Manning was editor of the 2nd edition, 2013, of Legislation and Regulation with Matthew C. Stephenson.) Manning's scholarship persuaded Justice Antonin Scalia to reconsider his majority opinion in Auer v. Robbins (1997).

Manning was considered as a possible candidate by the Harvard Corporation to be President of Harvard University, though ultimately the position went to Claudine Gay instead. On March 1, 2024, Harvard interim president Alan Garber announced that Manning would serve as the university's interim provost beginning on March 14, with John C. P. Goldberg taking Manning's place as acting dean. On August 15, Manning was appointed as the permanent university provost, formally resigning as the HLS dean.

== Awards and honors ==
Manning has received the American Bar Association's Award for Scholarship in Administrative Law, and won twice the Willis Reese Prize for Excellence in Teaching of Columbia University. On April 30, 2013, Manning was elected to the American Academy of Arts and Sciences. He was elected as a member of the American Law Institute on August 1, 2018.

== Selected works ==
- Manning, John F. (April 1996). "Constitutional Structure and Judicial Deference to Agency Interpretations of Agency Rules". Columbia Law Review. 96 (3): 612–696. doi:10.2307/1123259. JSTOR 1123259. SSRN 2849555.
- Manning, John F. (April 1997). "Textualism As a Nondelegation Doctrine". Columbia Law Review. 97 (3): 673–739. doi:10.2307/1123360. JSTOR 1123360. SSRN 2849460.
- Manning, John F. (2000). "The Nondelegation Doctrine as a Canon of Avoidance". The Supreme Court Review. 2000. University of Chicago Press: 223–277. doi:10.1086/scr.2000.3109680. JSTOR 3109680. S2CID 146859299. SSRN 2852573.
- Manning, John F. (January 2001). "Textualism and the Equity of the Statute". Columbia Law Review. 101 (1): 1–127. doi:10.2307/1123509. JSTOR 1123509. SSRN 2849561.
- Manning, John F. (June 2003). "The Absurdity Doctrine". Harvard Law Review. 116 (8): 2387–2486. doi:10.2307/1342768. JSTOR 1342768. SSRN 2849578.
- Manning, John F. (June 2004). "The Eleventh Amendment and the Reading of Precise Constitutional Texts". The Yale Law Journal. 113 (8): 1663–1750. doi:10.2307/4135780. JSTOR 4135780. SSRN 2852571.
- Manning, John F. (June 2004). "Nonlegislative Rules". George Washington Law Review. 72 (5): 893–945. doi:10.2139/ssrn.2852017. SSRN 2852017.
- Manning, John F. (2004). "Continuity and the Legislative Design". Notre Dame Law Review. 79 (5): 1863–1889.
- Manning, John F. (April 2005). "Textualism and Legislative Intent". Virginia Law Review. 91 (2): 419–450. JSTOR 3649428. SSRN 2853690.
- Manning, John F. (January 2006). "What Divides Textualists from Purposivists?". Columbia Law Review. 106 (1): 70–111. JSTOR 4099461. SSRN 2849247.
- Manning, John F. (2006). "Competing Presumptions About Statutory Coherence". Fordham Law Review. 74. SSRN 2854518.
- Manning, John F. (June 2009). "Federalism and the Generality Problem in Constitutional Interpretation". Harvard Law Review. 122 (8): 2003–2069. JSTOR 40379785. SSRN 2849593.

== See also ==
- List of law clerks for the ninth seat of the Supreme Court of the United States
