= James Barr Ames =

American law educator (1846–1910)

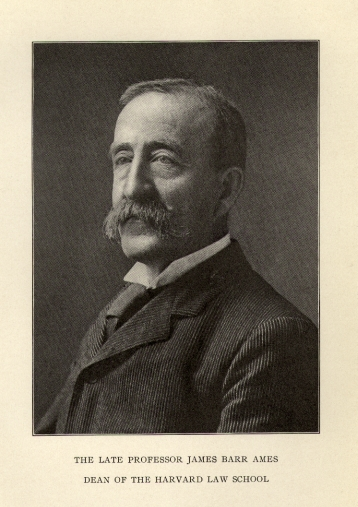

2nd Dean of Harvard Law School
- In office 1895–1910
- Preceded by: Christopher Columbus Langdell
- Succeeded by: Ezra Ripley Thayer

Personal details
- Born: June 22, 1846 Boston, Massachusetts, U.S.
- Died: January 8, 1910 (aged 63) Wilton, New Hampshire, U.S.
- Spouse: Sarah Russell (m. 1880)
- Children: 2
- Education: Harvard University (AB, LLB)

James Barr Ames (June 22, 1846 – January 8, 1910) was an American law educator, best known for popularizing the case method of teaching law.

== Early life and education ==
Ames was born in Boston, Massachusetts on June 22, 1846; son of Samuel T. and Mary H. (Barr) Ames and grandson of James Barr, M.D. He received his primary education in Boston, before obtaining his bachelor's degree from Harvard College in 1868 and his LLB from Harvard Law School in 1872.

== Career ==
He began working as a tutor and instructor at Harvard in 1871, and continued until 1873, when he was admitted to the bar. Although a licensed lawyer, Ames did not open a private practice, spending his full-time at Harvard during his entire career. He started as a French and German tutor in 1871 before becoming an instructor in history in 1872.

=== Harvard Law School ===
Ames joined the faculty at Harvard Law School in 1873 as an assistant professor before becoming a full professor in 1877. In 1895, Ames became the 2nd Dean of Harvard Law School, succeeding Christopher Columbus Langdell. He served until his death in 1910.

Ames has been called "the foremost teacher of law of his time, being not only an exceptionally broad and accurate scholar, and a profound student of the history of common law, but also having special ability in the development of clear and exact thought in those under his instruction".

In teaching law to his Harvard students, Ames used actual legal cases to illustrate legal principles, a concept which had been developed by Christopher Columbus Langdell. Ames insisted that legal education should require the study of actual cases instead of abstract principles of law. He was instrumental in introducing the case method in the teaching of law, a method which had come into general use in US law schools at the time of his death, and which continues to the present. He was elected a Fellow of the American Academy of Arts and Sciences in 1878. He was a manager of the 1907-founded Comparative Law Bureau of the American Bar Association, whose Annual Bulletin was the first comparative law journal in the U.S. Ames had received the degree of LL.D. from six universities by the time of his passing.

== Personal life ==
Ames married Sarah Russell on June 28, 1880. The couple had two sons, Robert Russell Ames and Richard Ames.

== Death ==
He died in Wilton, New Hampshire, on January 8, 1910. He had been admitted to a sanitarium for five weeks following a nervous breakdown.

Academic offices
Preceded by Christopher Columbus Langdell	Dean of Harvard Law School; 1895–1910	Succeeded by Ezra Ripley Thayer
