= Martha Minow =

American legal scholar (born 1954)

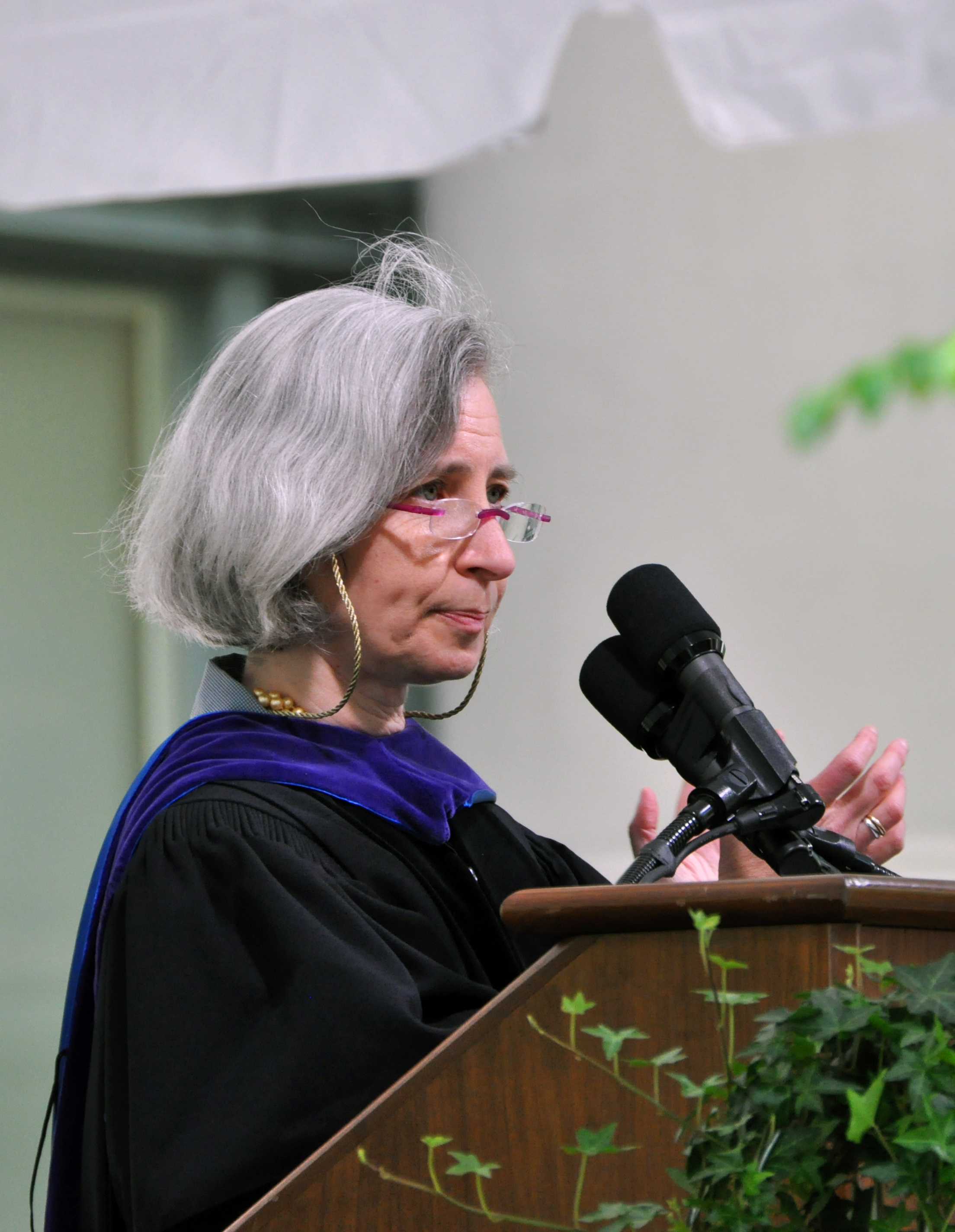
- Minow in 2010

12th Dean of Harvard Law School
- In office July 1, 2009 – June 30, 2017
- Preceded by: Elena Kagan
- Succeeded by: John Manning

Personal details
- Born: Martha Louise Minow; December 6, 1954 (age 71) Highland Park, Illinois, U.S.
- Spouse: Joseph W. Singer
- Children: 1
- Education: University of Michigan (BA); Harvard University (MEd); Yale University (JD)
- Website: Official bio

Martha Louise Minow (born December 6, 1954) is an American legal scholar and the 300th Anniversary University Professor at Harvard University. She served as the 12th dean of Harvard Law School between 2009 and 2017 and has taught at the Law School since 1981.

Minow was one of the candidates mentioned to replace U.S. Supreme Court Associate Justice John Paul Stevens upon his retirement. She has been called "one of the world's leading human rights scholars" and "one of the world's leading figures in bringing legal ideas and scholarship to bear on issues of identity, race and equality, including innovative approaches to reconciliation among divided peoples."

== Early life, family and education ==
Minow is the daughter of former Federal Communications Commission chairman Newton Minow and his wife, Josephine (Baskin) Minow. She is the sister of Nell Minow. The family is Jewish.

Martha Minow graduated from New Trier Township High School in Wilmette, Illinois, in 1972. She subsequently received her undergraduate degree from the University of Michigan (1975), her master's degree in education from the Harvard Graduate School of Education (1976), and her Juris Doctor (J.D.) degree from Yale Law School (1979), where she was an editor of the Yale Law Journal.

== Career ==
After graduating from law school, Minow clerked for Judge David L. Bazelon of the United States Court of Appeals for the D.C. Circuit and then for Justice Thurgood Marshall of the United States Supreme Court.

She joined the Harvard Law faculty as an assistant professor in 1981, was promoted to professor in 1986, was named the William Henry Bloomberg Professor of Law in 2003, and became the Jeremiah Smith Jr., Professor of Law in 2005. Minow became Dean of Harvard Law School July 1, 2009. She is also a lecturer in the Harvard Graduate School of Education.

On June 30, 2017, Minow stepped down from her post as Morgan and Helen Chu Dean and Professor of Law. From 2017 to 2018, she served as Carter Professor of General Jurisprudence. In 2018, she assumed her current position as the 300th Anniversary University Professor at Harvard University.

== Works, honors, and recognition ==
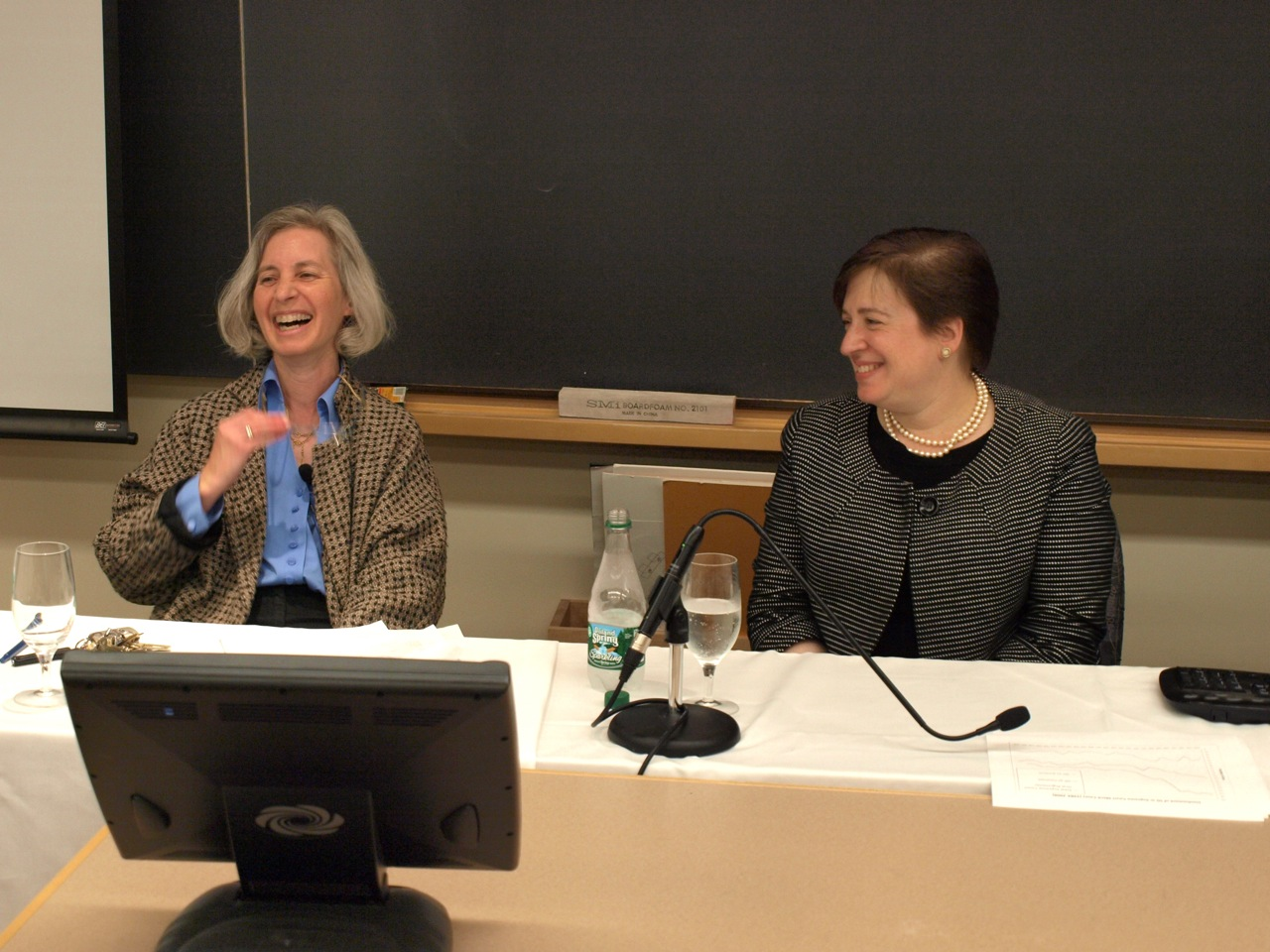
Martha Minow (left) and then-Solicitor General Elena Kagan at Harvard Law School, September 2009

Minow served on the Independent International Commission on Kosovo and helped to launch Imagine Co-existence, a program of the U.N. High Commissioner for Refugees, to promote peaceful development in post-conflict societies. Her five-year partnership with the federal Department of Education and the Center for Applied Special Technology worked to increase access to the curriculum for students with disabilities and resulted in both legislative initiatives and a voluntary national standard opening access to curricular materials for individuals with disabilities. She has worked on the Divided Cities initiative which is building an alliance of global cities dealing with ethnic, religious, or political divisions.

During the 2008 Presidential campaign, then-Senator Obama said, "When I was at Harvard Law School I had a teacher who changed my life -- Martha Minow." In August 2009, President Barack Obama nominated Dean Minow to the board of the Legal Services Corporation, a bi-partisan, government-sponsored organization that provides civil legal assistance to low-income Americans. The U.S. Senate confirmed her appointment on March 19, 2010, and she now serves as Vice-Chair and co-chair of its Pro Bono Task Force. In 2019 she was awarded the Leo Baeck Medal.

She is a former member of the board of the Bazelon Center for Mental Health Law, the Iranian Human Rights Documentation Center, and former chair of the Scholar's Board of Facing History and Ourselves. A fellow of the American Academy of Arts & Sciences since 1992, Minow has also been a senior fellow of Harvard's Society of Fellows, a member of Harvard University Press Board of Syndics, a senior fellow and twice acting director of what is now Harvard's Safra Foundation Center on Ethics, a fellow of the American Bar Foundation and a Fellow of the American Philosophical Society. She has delivered more than 70 named or endowed lectures and key-note addresses.

In 2020, Minow spoke with the podcast Criminal in the episode "Learning How to Forgive."

== Selected works ==
- When Should Law Forgive?. W. W. Norton and Company (2019). ISBN 978-0-393-08176-3.
- The First Global Prosecutor: Promise and Constraints, with C. Cora True-Frost and Alex Whiting, eds. University of Michigan Press (2015). ISBN 978-0-472-07251-4.
- In Brown's Wake: Legacies of America's Educational Landmark. Oxford University Press (2010)
- Government by Contract: Outsourcing and American Democracy, Jody Freeman & Martha L. Minow, eds. Harvard University Press (2009)
- Just Schools: Pursuing Equality in Societies of Difference. Martha Minow, Richard A. Shweder, and Hazel Markus, eds. Russell Sage Foundation (2008)
- "Living Up to Rules: Holding Soldiers Responsible for Abusive Conduct and the Dilemma of the Superior Orders Defence". 52 McGill Law Journal 1 (2007)
- "Tolerance in an Age of Terror". 16 University of Southern California Interdisciplinary Law Journal 453 (2007)
- "Should Religious Groups Ever Be Exempt From Civil Rights Laws?". 48 Boston College Law Review 781 (2007)
- "Outsourcing Power: How Privatizing Military Efforts Challenges Accountability, Professionalism, and Democracy". 46 Boston College Law Review 989 (2005)
- Partners, Not Rivals: Privatization and the Public Good. (2002)
- Engaging Cultural Differences, ed. with Richard Shweder and Hazel Markus (2002)
- Between Vengeance and Forgiveness: Facing History After Genocide and Mass Violence (1998)
- Not Only For Myself: Identity, Politics, and Law (1997)
- Making All the Difference: Inclusion, Exclusion, and American Law (1990)
- "Law Turning Outward". Telos, 73 (Fall 1987)

== See also ==
- Barack Obama Supreme Court candidates
- List of law clerks for the tenth seat of the Supreme Court of the United States
- Leslie Moonves
- Jim Lanzone
- Joseph Ianniello
- Elena Kagan
- Thurgood Marshall

Academic offices
Preceded by Elena Kagan	Dean of Harvard Law School; 2009–2017	Succeeded by John F. Manning
