= Erwin Griswold =

American lawyer (1904–1994)

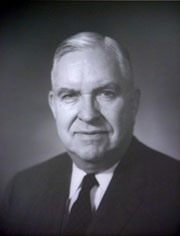

34th Solicitor General of the United States
- In office October 23, 1967 – March 21, 1973
- President: Lyndon B. Johnson; Richard Nixon
- Preceded by: Thurgood Marshall
- Succeeded by: Robert Bork

6th Dean of Harvard Law School
- In office 1946–1967
- Preceded by: James M. Landis
- Succeeded by: Derek Bok

Personal details
- Born: Erwin Nathaniel Griswold; July 14, 1904 East Cleveland, Ohio, U.S.
- Died: November 19, 1994 (aged 90) Boston, Massachusetts, U.S.
- Party: Republican
- Education: Oberlin College (BA, MA); Harvard University (LLB, SJD)

Erwin Nathaniel Griswold (/ˈɡrɪzwɔːld, -wəld/; July 14, 1904 – November 19, 1994) was an American appellate attorney and legal scholar who argued many cases before the U.S. Supreme Court. Griswold served as Solicitor General of the United States (1967–1973) under Presidents Lyndon B. Johnson and Richard M. Nixon. He also served as the dean of Harvard Law School for 21 years. Several times he was considered for appointment to the U.S. Supreme Court. During a career that spanned more than six decades, he served as member of the U.S. Commission on Civil Rights and as president of the American Bar Foundation.

== Early life and education ==
Griswold was born in East Cleveland, Ohio, to Hope (Erwin) and James Harlen Griswold. Griswold graduated from Oberlin College in 1925 with an A.B. in mathematics and an M.A. in political science. He attended Harvard Law School from 1925 to 1929, earning an LL.B. summa cum laude in 1928 and an S.J.D. in 1929. Griswold compiled The Bluebook, a uniform system of legal citation used by law professionals, in 1926 while a student at Harvard Law School.

In 1929, Griswold was admitted to the Ohio bar and spent six weeks working as a partner in his father's Cleveland law firm of Griswold, Green, Palmer & Hadden. He subsequently joined the U.S. Office of the Solicitor General as a staff attorney and served as a special assistant to the attorney general from 1929 to 1934. There he worked under Solicitor General Charles Evans Hughes Jr., son of the future Chief Justice of the United States, Charles Evans Hughes Sr. He became an expert at arguing tax cases before the Supreme Court, and is considered one of the great scholars in tax law.

During his academic career, Griswold was elected to the American Academy of Arts and Sciences in 1941 and the American Philosophical Society in 1955.

== Academic career ==
Griswold joined the Harvard faculty in 1934, first as an associate legal professor, and then as a full professor from 1935 to 1946. Known for a very keen intellect, Griswold was made dean of Harvard Law School from 1946 and served in that capacity until 1967. One of the dominant figures in American legal education, he doubled the size of the faculty, bringing in legal scholars Derek Bok (who succeeded him as dean, and later became president of Harvard University), Kingman Brewster (later president of Yale University), and Alan Dershowitz. In 1946, just after Griswold was made dean, Soia Mentschikoff was appointed visiting professor, the first woman faculty member in the history of Harvard Law School.

On December 11, 1934, the Harvard Law Review published an article by Griswold titled "Government in Ignorance of the Law – A Plea for Better Publication of Executive Legislation". The arguments Griswold made for orderly publication of the official actions of the Executive Branch were underlined when the Supreme Court issued its opinion in Panama Refining Co. v. Ryan and forced the hand of the committee studying the issue for President Roosevelt. Congress passed legislation to create the Federal Register, and the president signed it into law (Pub. L. 74-220, July 26, 1935).

As dean, Griswold enlarged the school's curriculum to include such specialized topics as labor relations, family law, and copyright law. In addition, he expanded the school's physical plant, library holdings, and financial resources. Finally, he began the process of convincing the Harvard Corporation to allow the enrollment of female students in 1948, and oversaw it beginning in Autumn of 1950. The Law School was the third graduate school at Harvard to admit women after the Graduate School of Education and the Medical School. It did so twenty-seven years before Harvard College fully admitted women as undergraduates in 1977.

In a 1992 interview, he recalled that at the time, over one-third of the faculty were against the admission of women.

In the 1950s, Griswold served as an expert witness for Thurgood Marshall, who was then the legal director of the NAACP, in several cases that the association brought to lay the foundation for the Supreme Court's desegregation order in Brown v. Board of Education.

Earlier in the 1950s Griswold denounced Senator Joseph R. McCarthy in his book The Fifth Amendment Today, which examined the constitutional protection against self-incrimination. A 1960 profile of Mr. Griswold in The New York Times said that "when Senator Joseph R. McCarthy was in full cry against the use of the Fifth Amendment by witnesses accused of Communist ties, one of the most forceful voices in defense of the constitutional privilege against self-incrimination was raised by Dean Erwin Nathaniel Griswold of the Harvard Law School."

Griswold was a member of the U.S. Civil Rights Commission from 1961 to 1967 having been appointed by John F. Kennedy. On May 8, 1963, in the midst of police violence and massive arrests of schoolchildren in Birmingham, Alabama, Kennedy held a press conference in which he answered a reporter's question about the matter of improving U.S. race relations, and a suggestion there was need for a fireside chat on civil rights, with the claim that the federal government had done all it legally could do about the issue. Griswold quickly responded publicly that this was untrue; "It seems clear to me that he hasn't even started to use the powers that are available to him." An angry Kennedy privately fumed, "That son-of-a-bitch! Let him try." On June 11, after another crisis—Governor George Wallace blocking the door to the University of Alabama—Kennedy finally gave his Report to the American People on Civil Rights.

In 1965 he remarked upon the debate over Magna Carta's impact across its centuries-long history: "Magna Carta is not primarily significant for what it was but rather for what it was made to be. It is the nature of man's habit of thought that when he seeks to bring about or to recognize change, he finds it easier if he can say with some measure of plausibility that what is new is simply an ancient truth."

== Solicitor General ==
On the same day that Griswold retired as dean and Langdell Professor of Law in 1967, President Johnson appointed him United States Solicitor General. Johnson was a Democrat and Griswold a moderate Republican, but the bipartisan appointment was widely praised. As Solicitor General, Griswold advocated in support of Great Society legislation, and he continued on in the position under President Nixon until 1973. Harriet S. Shapiro became the first woman attorney in the Solicitor General's office when Griswold hired her in 1972.

As Solicitor General, Griswold unsuccessfully argued against the publication of the Pentagon Papers by The New York Times, because such publication would cause a "grave and immediate danger to the security of the United States." Years later, he reversed his position in an op-ed piece entitled "Secrets Not Worth Keeping" in The Washington Post, writing, "I have never seen any trace of a threat to the national security from the publication" of the Pentagon Papers. He suggested that government demands for secrecy be treated with some skepticism by the public.

== Later years ==
In 1973, Griswold resigned as Solicitor General and joined the international law firm of Jones Day Reavis & Pogue in Washington, D.C. He continued to argue many cases before the Supreme Court up until his death in 1994. He also served as a mentor to many of the young lawyers in the firm.

Harvard Law School's Griswold Hall, which houses faculty offices including that of the dean, was named for him in 1979.

From 1983 to 1994, he served the U.S. government as a liaison between U.S. and Soviet lawyers in the Lawyers Alliance Nuclear Arms Control. Griswold was also active in the Supreme Court Historical Society, serving as chairman of the board of trustees at the time of his death in 1994.

Griswold also served as a trustee of his undergraduate alma mater, Oberlin College. In October 2014, the President of Oberlin, Marvin Krislov, in a detailed tribute to Griswold, announced the creation of the Erwin N. Griswold '25 Chair in Politics and Law.

Griswold wrote several books including Spendthrift Trusts (1936), Cases on Federal Taxation (1940), Cases on Conflict Laws (1942), and arguably his most popular, The Fifth Amendment Today, Law and Lawyers in the United States (1992). Throughout his career he received numerous honorary degrees from many prestigious universities, including Columbia University, Northwestern University, Brown University, and the University of Sydney. Griswold served as president of the Association of American Law Schools from 1957 to 1958 and as President of the American Bar Foundation from 1971 to 1974. In 1978, the American Bar Association awarded Griswold the gold medal for his outstanding contributions and service to the legal community.

In 1985, at a ceremony commemorating the 50th Anniversary of the United States Supreme Court Building, Griswold gave a speech in which he compared the work Ruth Bader Ginsburg had done for women's rights to that which Charles Hamilton Houston and Thurgood Marshall had done for the civil rights of racial minorities. Griswold was on President Jimmy Carter's selection committee for the District of Columbia Circuit which recommended Ginsburg to sit on the United States Court of Appeals there. It was this speech which was used by Martin Ginsburg and New York Senator Daniel Patrick Moynihan to first lobby President Bill Clinton for the nomination of then-Judge Ruth Bader Ginsburg to the United States Supreme Court, and later the United States Senate to confirm Justice Ginsburg.

Together with William H. Brown III and on behalf of the Lawyers' Committee for Civil Rights Under Law, Griswold testified against the confirmation of Clarence Thomas based on then-Judge Thomas' then-lack of judicial experience and his frequent reference to the legal theory of natural law. Their testimony took place on September 17, 1991, some 24 days before Anita Hill was called to testify in the Thomas nomination hearings.

Griswold's memoirs were published in 1992 under the title Ould Fields, New Corne: The Personal Memoirs of a Twentieth Century Lawyer.

Erwin Griswold died on November 19, 1994, in Boston, at the age of 90. He was survived at the time of his death by his wife of 62 years, Harriet Allena Ford (died 1999), two children, five grandchildren, and one great-grandchild.

Griswold has no relation to Colorado Secretary of State Jena Griswold.

== In popular culture ==
In the 2014 HBO Films production Muhammad Ali's Greatest Fight, Peter McRobbie appears as Griswold who, as United States Solicitor General, was tasked with defending the United States Government against Muhammed Ali's litigation in Clay v. United States.

Griswold is briefly portrayed in Steven Spielberg's 2017 film The Post by Kenneth Tigar.

He is played by Sam Waterston in 2018's biographical legal drama On the Basis of Sex.

== See also ==
- Bluebook
- Harvard Law School

Academic offices
Preceded by James M. Landis	Dean of Harvard Law School; 1946–1967	Succeeded by Derek Bok
Legal offices
Preceded by Thurgood Marshall	Solicitor General of the United States; 1967–1973	Succeeded by Robert Bork
