= List of deans of Harvard Law School =

Head of Harvard Law School

Dean of Harvard Law School
- Incumbent; John C. P. Goldberg since March 14, 2024
- Seat: Harvard University
- First holder: Christopher Columbus Langdell
- Website: www.law.harvard.edu

The dean of Harvard Law School is the head of Harvard Law School. The current dean is John C.P. Goldberg—the 14th person to hold the post—who succeeded John Manning in 2024 on an interim basis before assuming the position permanently in 2025.

== List of deans of Harvard Law School ==
Founded in 1817, Harvard Law School is the oldest continuously operating law school in the United States. Since its founding, 14 people have officially served as dean.

| No. | Picture | Name | Took office | Left office |
|---|---|---|---|---|
| 1 | Christopher Columbus Langdell | Christopher Columbus Langdell | 1870 | 1895 |
| 2 | James Barr Ames | James Barr Ames | 1895 | 1910 |
| 3 | Ezra Ripley Thayer | Ezra Ripley Thayer | 1910 | 1915 |
| 4 | Roscoe Pound | Roscoe Pound | 1916 | 1936 |
| 5 | James M. Landis | James M. Landis | 1937 | 1946 |
| 6 | Erwin Griswold | Erwin Griswold | 1946 | 1967 |
| 7 | Derek Bok | Derek Bok | 1968 | 1971 |
| 8 | Albert Sacks | Albert Sacks | 1971 | 1981 |
| 9 | | James Vorenberg | 1981 | 1989 |
| 10 | | Robert C. Clark | 1989 | 2003 |
| 11 | Elena Kagan | Elena Kagan | 2003 | 2009 |
| 12 | Martha Minow | Martha Minow | 2009 | 2017 |
| 13 | John F. Manning | John F. Manning | 2017 | 2024 |
| 14 | | John C. P. Goldberg | 2024 (interim) 2025 (permanent) | present |

== Acting deans ==
Several individuals have also served as acting dean at one time or another. They are: Samuel Williston (1909–10), Austin Wakeman Scott (1915–16), Edward Henry Warren (1921–22), Joseph Warren (1925–26 and 1929), Joseph Henry Beale (1929–30), Edmund Morris Morgan (1936–37, 1942–45), Robert Amory Jr. (1948), Livingston Hall (1959), Andrew James Casner (1967–68), Howell E. Jackson (2009), and John C. P. Goldberg (March 14, 2024 to July 1, 2025).

== See also ==
- Law school dean
