= Matina Horner =

American psychologist (born 1939)

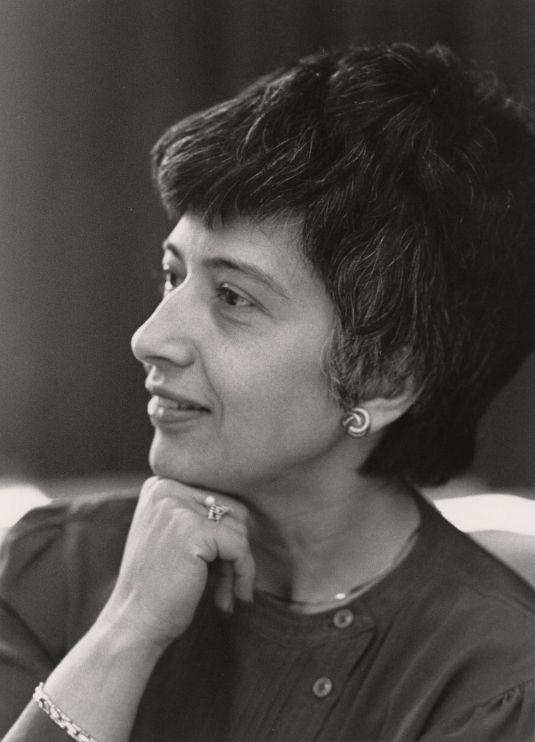
- Born: Matina Souretis; July 28, 1939 (age 87); Roxbury, Massachusetts
- Education: Bryn Mawr College; University of Michigan
- Occupations: Psychologist, university teacher, university president
- Employer: Radcliffe College
- Spouse: Joseph L. Horner
- Awards: Radcliffe Medal (1988); Kenneth D. Herman, Ph.D., J.D. Career Contribution Award (1987)

Matina Souretis Horner (born July 28, 1939) is an American psychologist who was the sixth president of Radcliffe College from 1972 to 1989. Her research interests included intelligence, motivation, and achievement of women. She is known for pioneering the concept of "fear of success".

== Early life ==
Horner was born in Roxbury, a neighborhood of Boston. She received her bachelor's degree in experimental psychology cum laude in 1961 from Bryn Mawr College, a master's degree in 1963 and a Ph.D. in psychology from the University of Michigan in 1968. While at the University of Michigan, she was a teaching fellow and lecturer. Horner was also a member of Phi Beta Kappa and Phi Kappa Phi.

== Career ==
Horner joined the Harvard faculty as lecturer in the Department of Social Relations in 1969 and in 1970 became assistant professor of personality and development.

In 1972, Horner was selected the sixth and youngest president in Radcliffe's history. She became president of Radcliffe College during a complicated era. During the tenure of her predecessor, Mary Bunting, the relationship between Harvard University and Radcliffe had reached what was known as the "non-merger merger" agreement in 1971. As a result, Harvard was primarily responsible for students although Radcliffe maintained a separate Admissions and Financial Aid Office. Additionally, Radcliffe had ceded some business operations such as payroll, accounting, dining halls, library, and buildings and grounds to Harvard, but maintained control of and administered its own educational, research and alumnae programs. Horner was assumed by many alumnae to have been appointed to oversee a complete merger and to pacify the opposition within Radcliffe, but at her inauguration she announced a middle course between the alumnae and the Harvard administration. She negotiated a new "transitional" agreement with Harvard's president Derek Bok in 1977 (also described as the "non-merger merger") that reestablished Radcliffe's financial independence and reaffirmed it as a separate institution, with its own administration, governing board, research programs, and a new oversight role and special programs for undergraduate women, while giving Radcliffe students full Harvard status and delegating responsibility for undergraduate instruction to Harvard to which all tuition fees would be turned over. She indicated women's ability to advance to the top professional positions as the goal of her tenure at the college, and championed women's studies research at Radcliffe that was to be "practical" and policy-oriented rather than feminist. In 1979, she oversaw the establishment at Radcliffe of the Murray Research Center: A Center for the Study of Lives, which conducted social science research on issues of concern to women. In 1982, she declared herself "a staunch supporter of women's colleges".

Horner was a signatory, alongside Bok, of the Business-Higher Education Forum's 1983 report America's Competitive Challenge, published in response to President Ronald Reagan's request for a position paper on education, which argued that "the function of the educational system … [was] service to the economy" and made the sole recommendation for "a shift in public attitudes about national priorities" so as to "develop a consensus that industrial competitiveness is crucial to our social and economic well being".

Horner was consistently criticised by some students for her liberal feminist stance and failing to put pressure on Harvard in the interests of women students and faculty during her tenure, although a women's studies concentration was eventually established at Harvard in 1988. Her Harvard left-feminist critics refused to speak on the record to The Boston Globe at her departure in 1989 due to ideological intimidation at Harvard. She was lauded for her leadership of Radcliffe and her stance on the issue of coeducation. Many resisted the coeducation movement of merging Harvard University and Radcliffe College because it would have meant the elimination of Radcliffe College. Ellen Sackson Heller (Radcliffe Class of 1939) stated, "If Radcliffe had merged, it would have meant to me that I no longer had a college." A merger would also have meant that Radcliffe would lose its autonomy. Horner said, "The challenge was to see if the mandate of Radcliffe could provide a leadership model for true coeducation that gave weight to women's voices, as opposed to just letting women enter a male world." Although Horner had many responsibilities, she made contact with Radcliffe students a priority during her presidency by holding weekly conferences and teaching several classes. Horner remained president until 1989, when she was succeeded by Linda Wilson.

== Honors ==
President Jimmy Carter in 1979 named Horner to the President's Commission for the National Agenda for the 1980s, and one year later, chairperson of the Task Force on the Quality of American Life.

Awards Horner has received include the Catalyst award (1979), awards from the American Civil Liberties Union, National Conference of Christians and Jews (1981), the Distinguished Bostonian Award (1990), the Ellis Island Medal (1990) as well as honorary degrees from Dickinson College, the University of Massachusetts, Mount Holyoke College, the University of Pennsylvania, Tufts University, Smith College, Wheaton College, the University of Hartford, the University of New England, and the University of Michigan.

== Personal life ==
She married Joseph Lefevre Horner (1934–2008), a physicist; they had three children.

== Bibliography ==
- McLeod, Heather (June 1989), "The College that Refused to Disappear", Radcliffe Quarterly, 75 (2): 2–6
- Synnott, Marcia Graham (2013), Student Diversity at the Big Three: Changes at Harvard, Yale, and Princeton Since the 1920s, New Brunswick, NJ: Transaction Publishers, ISBN 978-1-4128-1461-4
