= Matthew C. Stephenson =

American lawyer

- Education: Harvard University (BA, PhD, JD)
- Occupation: Law professor
- Known for: Expert on anti-corruption law

Matthew Caleb Stephenson is an American legal scholar and political scientist who is the Eli Goldston Professor of Law at Harvard Law School, where he teaches administrative law, legislation and regulation, anti-corruption law and the political economy of public law. His research interests include the application of positive political theory to public law.

== Biography ==
Stephenson graduated from Harvard University with a B.A. in East Asian studies, magna cum laude, in 1997. He then earned a Juris Doctor, magna cum laude, from Harvard Law School and a Ph.D. in political science from the Harvard Graduate School of Arts and Sciences, both in 2003. After receiving his doctorate, he clerked for Judge Stephen Williams of the United States Court of Appeals for the District of Columbia Circuit from 2003 to 2004 and then clerked for Justice Anthony Kennedy on the Supreme Court of the United States during the 2004–05 term.

In 2005, Stephenson joined the faculty of Harvard Law School as an assistant professor. In 2009, he was granted tenure and in 2010 was named a professor. In 2012, he received the Charles Fried Intellectual Diversity Award from the Law School. In 2018, he was named as the Eli Goldston Professor of Law. He has served as a consultant to the World Bank and as Special Rapporteur for the Commission on Legal Empowerment of the Poor. In 2010, he was a visiting scholar at the University of Chicago.

He is the co-author with John F. Manning of the casebook Legislation and Regulation (Foundation Press, 2010). In his publications, Stephenson has argued that regulators should choose the optimal mix between policy preferences and fidelity to the text of a statute during agency rulemaking.

Stephenson has extensively studied corruption in various countries. In February 2014 he initiated The Global Anticorruption Blog, a platform dedicated to analyzing and discussing corruption issues worldwide. In 2017, he organized a conference at Harvard Law School focused on populist plutocrats, aiming to encourage more comprehensive and rigorous research on this political phenomenon.

Stephenson is widely cited in the press as an expert in anti-corruption and international law.

== See also ==
- List of law clerks for the first seat of the Supreme Court of the United States

== Selected publications ==
=== Books ===
- Stephenson, Matthew C.; Manning, John F. (2017). Legislation and Regulation (3rd ed.). Foundation Press, University Casebook series. ISBN 9781609302177. 1st edition, 2010; 2nd edition, 2013.

=== Articles ===
- Stephenson, Matthew C. (2011). "Information Acquisition and Institutional Design". Harvard Law Review. 124: 1422.
- Stephenson, Matthew C.; Nzelibe, Jide O. (2010). "Complementary Constraints: Separation of Powers, Rational Voting, and Constitutional Design". Harvard Law Review. 123: 1617.
- Stephenson, Matthew C. (2008). "The Price of Public Action: Constitutional Doctrine and the Judicial Manipulation of Legislative Enactment Costs". Yale Law Journal. 118 (1): 2–62. doi:10.2307/20454703. JSTOR 20454703. S2CID 158557718.
- Stephenson, Matthew C. (2006). "The Strategic Substitution Effect: Textual Plausibility, Procedural Formality, and Judicial Review of Agency Statutory Interpretations". Harvard Law Review. 126: 528.
