= Robert C. Clark =

American legal academic (born 1944)

10th Dean of Harvard Law School
- In office 1989–2003
- Preceded by: James Vorenberg
- Succeeded by: Elena Kagan

Personal details
- Born: 1944 (age 81–82) New Orleans, Louisiana, U.S.
- Education: Maryknoll College (BA); Columbia University (PhD); Harvard University (JD)
- Occupation: Lawyer, Educator

Robert C. Clark (born 1944) is an American legal scholar at Harvard University, where he is Distinguished Service Professor, emeritus and the Austin Wkeman Scott Professor of Law, emeritus at Harvard Law School. He previously served as dean and professor of law at Harvard Law School from 1989 to 2003. Clark is recognized as a leading authority in corporate law and corporate governance.

== Career ==
In 1966, Clark earned his Bachelor of Arts from Maryknoll College, a Catholic seminary in New York. Clark later received his Doctor of Philosophy in philosophy from Columbia University in 1971, and his Juris Doctor from Harvard Law School in 1972. From 1972 to 1974, Clark was an associate with the Boston law firm of Ropes and Gray, where he practiced commercial and corporate law. After this, Clark spent four years on the faculty of Yale Law School, where he became a tenured professor. In 1979, he returned to Harvard Law School as a professor of law.

Clark has also consulted for law firms and government agencies, and he testified before various Congressional committees and subcommittees on regulation of financial institutions.

Clark was the Dean and Royall Professor of Law at Harvard Law School from 1989 through July 2003. Under Clark's leadership as Dean, the Harvard Law School was said to have "more than quadrupled its endowment, strengthened its curriculum and research programs, expanded the faculty and significantly improved its student-faculty ratio."

In November 2002, Clark announced plans to conclude his service as Dean on June 30, 2003. Elena Kagan was named as the next Dean of the Harvard Law School, beginning July 1, 2003.

On December 16, 2003, Time Warner announced that its board of directors elected Clark to join on the board in January 2004 and serve on its Nominating and Governance Committee and its Audit and Finance Committee.

== Personal life ==
Clark was born in 1944 in New Orleans, Louisiana. He is married to Kathleen Tighe Clark and they have two children.

== Publications ==
Books

- Corporate Law (1986)

Articles

- "Major Trends Lead Us Back to Basics," 31 Journal of Corporate Law 591 (2006).
- "Moral Systems in the Regulation of Nonprofits: How Value Commitments Matter," Hauser Center Working Papers, October 2006, at No. 33.6.
- "Corporate Governance Changes in the Wake of the Sarbanes-Oxley Act: A Morality Tale for Policymakers Too," 22 Georgia State Law Review 251 (2005).
- "Why So Many Lawyers? Are They Good or Bad?" 61 Fordham Law Review 275 (1993).
- "Contracts, Elites and Traditions in the Making of Corporate Law," 89 Columbia Law Review 7 (1989).
- Corporate Law (Little, Brown 1986).
- "The Four Stages of Capitalism," 94 Harvard Law Review 561 (1981).
- "Does the Nonprofit Form Fit the Health Care Industry?" 93 Harvard Law Review 1416 (1980).

== See also ==
- US corporate law

Academic offices
Preceded by James Vorenberg	Dean of Harvard Law School; 1989–2003	Succeeded by Elena Kagan
