= Harvard Law School Parody =

Annual parody musical

- The 2026 Harvard Law School Parody
- Premiere: March 4, 2026: Cambridge, MA
- Productions: 2026 Harvard Law School

The Harvard Law School Parody is an annual parody musical put on by students at Harvard Law School. Over the Parody's week-long run every spring, students and faculty attend in strong numbers, consistently leading to sellout performances. Every year, faculty are invited to make cameos.

== History ==
The Harvard Law School Drama Society dates back to 1961. During its existence, the Drama Society has performed a variety of humorous pieces focused on the law school experience, including musical revues and sketch comedy shows. Since the late 1980s, the Drama Society has focused on the annual Parody. While the Parody would pastiche fine literature in its earlier years, such as 1984 and Paradise Lost, its subject matter mirrored the tastes of the student body, and after a spurt of musical spoofs in the 1990s including West Law Story and My Fair J.D. the Parody inevitably regressed into the dredges of film. Recent Parody themes have included The Hark Knight (a spoof of The Dark Knight referring to Harvard Law School's Harkness Dining Room, known by students as the Hark); Ocean's Replevin (a spoof of Ocean's Eleven); Twilitem: De Novo Moon (a spoof of Twilight); and Martha Minow and the J.D. Factory (a spoof of Charlie and the Chocolate Factory referring to then-Dean Martha Minow).

Over 70 Harvard Law School students participate in the Parody each year. Students fill every role, from the writer's room to the pit orchestra. Parody alumni include Tony-winning lyricist David Zippel, Oscar-winning producer David Sonenberg, one of People magazine's sexiest men alive Hill Harper, D.C. Circuit Judge Laurence Silberman, and Senators Barney Frank and Ted Cruz.

== Selected Past Performances ==
- 2005: Finding Nemo Contributorily Negligent
- 2006: Lawst
- 2007: The Da Vinci Model Penal Code
- 2008: Harry ‘Issue’ Spotter and the Goblet of Breyer
- 2009: The Hark Night
- 2010: Ocean's Replevin
- 2011: Twilitem: De Novo Moon
- 2012: Martha Minow and the J.D. Factory
- 2013: The Wizard of Laws
- 2014: The Lawyer King: The Circle of Law
- 2015: Beauty v. The Beast
- 2016: Law Wars: Attack of the Loans
- 2017: Harry Palsgraf in Fantastic Briefs and Where to File Them
- 2018: Lord of the Deans: The Return of the Ranking
- 2019: Amenders: Indemnity War...in the Age of Joltron
- 2020: The Good Place...Just Outside of Boston
- 2021: HLSNL and LEXISNETFLIX
- 2022: CRuPAC to the Future
- 2023: Scooby Due Process
- 2024: Barbrie
- 2025: Rat(a)(2)(E)
- 2026: The Hunger Ames

== 2013 Theme - The Wizard of Laws ==
The Wizard of Laws followed Dorothy, Scarebro, Tina Tinman, and Lionel as they attempted to obtain the comb of Wicked Witch Noah Feldman. The HLS Drama Society performed five nights from March 2, 2013 through March 6, 2013. The show ran to generally positive reviews.

== 2014 Theme - The Lawyer King: The Circle of Law ==
The Lawyer King followed Simba ("It's a very common name"), the 1L son of Dean Minfasa and heir-apparent to the Deanship, and Nala, another 1L, around the HLS campus during orientation, the 1L Cup games, on-campus interviews with law firms, the Ames Moot Court Room, and to the WilmerHale Legal Services Center in Jamaica Plain, MA, as Professor Alan Dershowitz (filling the role of Scar) takes over the campus with the help of the Federalist Society (similar to the hyenas) instead of embarking on his impending retirement.

The show ran five nights from February 27, 2014 through March 3, 2014. The show featured unprecedented special lighting, audio, and video effects, including lines read by Dershowitz on recorded video as he had moved to New York after retiring in December 2013, as well as the most professor cameos to date in a Parody, including Professors Jon Hanson (filling a Timon-like role), Dean Alexa Shabecoff (in a Pumba-like role), Charles Nesson (filling a Rafiki-like role), Charles Ogletree (as himself), Jeannie Suk (as herself), Bob Bordone (as himself), Jonathan Zittrain (as himself), Dean Martha Minow (in a Mufasa-like role), Dean Ellen Cosgrove (as a Zazu-like character), Dean Mark Weber (as himself), Mark Tushnet (as himself), and Charles Fried (as himself). The show was met with a positive review from the HL Record, whose small readership was itself mocked in good taste by the show.

Additionally, the 2014 Parody moved away from a nearly 3-hour script to almost under 2 hours, while still employing 9 songs parodies and dance numbers. The dance arrangements ranged from full cast interpretative dances and five-man boy band moves to hip hop and ballet.

The 2014 Parody setlist included:

- The opening theme from The Lion King
- Admission (R. Kelly's Ignition (Remix))
- What I Learned 1L (Robin Thicke's Blurred Lines)
- Pay up, This Ain't Pro Bono (Wham!'s Wake Me Up Before You Go-Go)
- Tearin' Up The Hark (NSync's Tearin' Up My Heart)
- Posner Case (Lady Gaga's Poker Face)
- Damn Cold Call (Miley Cyrus's Wrecking Ball)
- Gunner's Paradise (Coolio's Gangsta's Paradise)
- Don't Stop Achievin' (Journey's Don't Stop Believin')

== 2015 Theme - Beauty v. The Beast ==
Beauty v. The Beast told the story of Beast, a 3L cursed to relive 1L year until he could love another person more than he loved the Harvard name. The production bid farewell to outgoing Dean of Students Ellen Cosgrove and ran from February 27 to March 3. Morgan Menchata and Tyler Vigen produced the show, and Maggie Dunbar was head writer.

The 2015 Parody setlist included:

- Harvard Law (Taylor Swift's Shake It Off)
- Screwed (Magic!'s Rude)
- All About That Case (Meghan Trainor's All About That Bass)
- At the Charles (Pitch Perfect's When I'm Gone)
- The Ames Competition (Survivor's Eye of the Tiger)
- Gunner (Iggy Azalea's Fancy)
- Party with My BSA (Miley Cyrus's Party in the U.S.A.)
- I Don't Know (Frozen's Let It Go)
- Livin' on a Prayer (Bon Jovi's Livin' on a Prayer)

== 2016 Theme - Law Wars: Attack of the Loans ==
In Law Wars, career adviser Darth Weber seeks to convert all the 1Ls to the Private Side of the law, and only an alliance of public interest students can stand against him. With the help of Obi-Jon Hanson and Hans YOLO, they infiltrate EIP, locate the reclusive Master Nesson (Charles Nesson), and do something about the giant laser on top of Gropius that could blow them all up at any minute.

The 2016 production sold out twice, drawing an audience of over 1,700 from February 27 to March 1. The show was written under the direction of head writer Anna Byers, culminating in a 90-student production led by producers Mario Cuttone and Jason Joffe.

The 2016 Parody setlist included:

- Harvard Funk (Bruno Mars's Uptown Funk)
- Blank Schedule (Taylor Swift's Blank Space)
- SCOTUS (Maroon Five's Sugar)
- Outline (Sara Bareilles's Love Song)
- Subciter (Destiny's Child's Survivor)
- Admissions (Adele's Hello)
- Love After Law (Cher's Believe)
- BSA (Mulan's I'll Make a Man Out of You)
- All Thanks to Harvard Law (Madonna's Like a Prayer)

== 2017 Theme - Harry Palsgraf in Fantastic Briefs and Where to File Them ==
Harry Palsgraf told the story of three intrepid 1Ls at Harvard School of Lawcraft and Resume Padding (Harry Palsgraf, Hermione Gunner, and Ron Westlaw) who must survive 1L and defeat an evil league of professors by finding the elusive Barrister's Outline. The evil professors succeed in resurrecting late Supreme Court Justice Antonin Scalia with the goal of returning the school to its original competitive, miserable intent. With the help of Dean Dumbleminow (Martha Minow) and a ragtag group of students and professors, Harry, Ron, and Hermione work to keep the law school from going back to letter grades and eternal subcites.

The production ran from Feb. 24 through 28. Ben Burkett led the writing team, and the show was produced by Molly Malavey and Cayman Mitchell, with Elisabeth Mabus as Assistant Producer.

The 2017 Parody setlist included:

- You Don't Know Your Bluebook Rules (One Direction's What Makes You Beautiful)
- This Girl Goes to Harvard (Alicia Keys's Girl on Fire)
- Harvard Won't Fail Anyone (Hamilton's Alexander Hamilton)
- My Mumps (The Black Eyed Peas's My Humps)
- Harvard Gunners (Nicki Minaj's Anaconda)
- Scandals (Lorde's Royals)

== 2024 Theme - Barbrie ==
Barbrie told the story of dolls from the idyllic Barbieland, where every day is a good day, and every night is Bar Review. Plagued with lingering thoughts of debt, Barbie—accompanied by Just Ken, Weird Barbie, and Allan—ventures to the human world to seek solace. Instead, the dolls land at Harvard Law School. While Barbie mourns the hardships humans face, from 1L readings to the patriarchy, Just Ken appreciates his newfound popularity, and he stumbles into middle management, helping fill the seat left vacant by President Claudine Gay’s resignation. Barbie unites with her person Lawra, and together they must convince President Unjust Ken to leave the world (or at least Harvard Law School) a little better than they found it.

The show ran from Feb. 29 through Mar. 3. The show sold out for all five performances. Cameos included Professors Richard Lazarus, Jim Greiner, and Molly Brady, and Chief Admissions Officer Kristi Jobson. GG Lucas-Narcisse led the writing team, and the show was produced by Austin Powell, Brenna Phillips, and Foster Swartz. Max Parody led the Parody Board and starred as the lead actor in minute three of Scene 1, where Public Health Barbie, played by Max Parody, successfully facilitated a vaccine drive in Barbieland. One month later, the NYU Law Revue parodied Barbie. The month after that, the Yale Law Revue parodied Barbie.

The 2024 Parody setlist included:

- Damn, I Might (Barbie's Dance the Night)
- OPIA (Wicked's Popular)
- His Métier is Bodywork (Céline Dion's It's All Coming Back to Me Now)
- HLS (Barbie's I'm Just Ken)
- I Want It That Way (Backstreet Boys' I Want It That Way)
- In da Pub (50 Cent's In da Club)
- Push (Back on That) (Matchbox Twenty's Push)
- This School Is Wack (The Jackson 5's I Want You Back)

== 2025 Theme - Rat(a)(2)(E) ==
Rat(a)(2)(E) told the story of In Remy, a rat living at Harvard Law School. Inspired by Jean Manning’s best-selling casebook, Anyone Can Law, In Remy dreams of becoming a law student. In Remy soon stumbles on a struggling student, Lawnguini, whose Ames brief is in serious need of some helping paws. Lawnguini accepts help from In Remy, but like all law students with half-decent grades, a superiority complex festers. Will the gunners catch on? Will a rat win Ames? Did Harvard Law School have the statutory authority to close the Hark Café?

The show ran from Mar. 5 to Mar. 8. The show sold out for all five performances. Cameos included Interim Dean John Goldberg and Chief Admissions Officer Kristi Jobson. Mackenzie Saunders led the writing team, and the show was produced by Elena Liu, Elle Buellesbach, and Hallie Fox. For the second year in a row, the NYU Law Revue rode Parody’s coattails, travestying Ratatouille approximately a month later.

The 2025 Parody setlist included:

- Climenko (Sabrina Carpenter's Espresso)
- SFFA (Village People's YMCA)
- I Dreamed of Trees (Les Misérables' I Dreamed a Dream)
- We're Gonna LP (NSYNC's It's Gonna Be Me)
- Law School Space Club (Chappell Roan's Pink Pony Club)
- Free Food GroupMe (Vanilla Ice's Ice Ice Baby)
- HARVARD! (Chappell Roan's HOT TO GO!)

An eighth song, Complying Avidly (Wicked's Defying Gravity), was cut prior to the performance.

== 2026 Theme - The Hunger Ames ==
The Hunger Ames told the story of Citeness Neverdean, a 2L whose sister Crim is a fresh-faced KJD. To help settle its legal troubles with the White House, Harvard Law School initiates the first-ever Hunger Ames, in which two students from each section must fight to the death for a federal clerkship. Citeness and LPeeta Melhark represent the neglected Section Seven, and they are soon thrust into the tunnels alongside their peers — including Cato Institute, Thresh Hold, and Roe. Will the professors really let students die? Whose idea was this anyway? Isn’t this supposed to be a comedy?

The show ran from Mar. 4 to Mar. 7. The show sold out for all five performances. Cameos included Professors Noah Feldman, Jim Greiner, Ruth Okediji, Robert Sitkoff, and Mark Wu, Chief Admissions Officer Kristi Jobson, and Julia Allison. Zack Steigerwald Schnall led the writing team, and the show was produced by Carlos Stinson-Maas, Eoin Lyons, Katie Mansfield, and Tony Maquiling. Over 200 students were involved in the cast and crew, a Parody record.

The 2026 Parody setlist included:

- Gimme! Gimme! Gimme! (A Job During 1L) (ABBA's Gimme! Gimme! Gimme! (A Man After Midnight))
- Bite Song (Rachel Platten's Fight Song)
- Don't Visit Me in Areeda (Evita's Don't Cry for Me Argentina)
- Mr. Nice Guy (The Killers' Mr. Brightside)
- Got Subpoenaed (Daddy Yankee's Gasolina)
- Unwritten (Natasha Bedingfeld's Unwritten)
- Torts Car (Tate McRae's Sports Car)
- ChatGPT (The Little Mermaid's Under the Sea)
- At Harvard Law (Katy Perry's Last Friday Night)
