= Jody Freeman =

American law professor (born 1964)

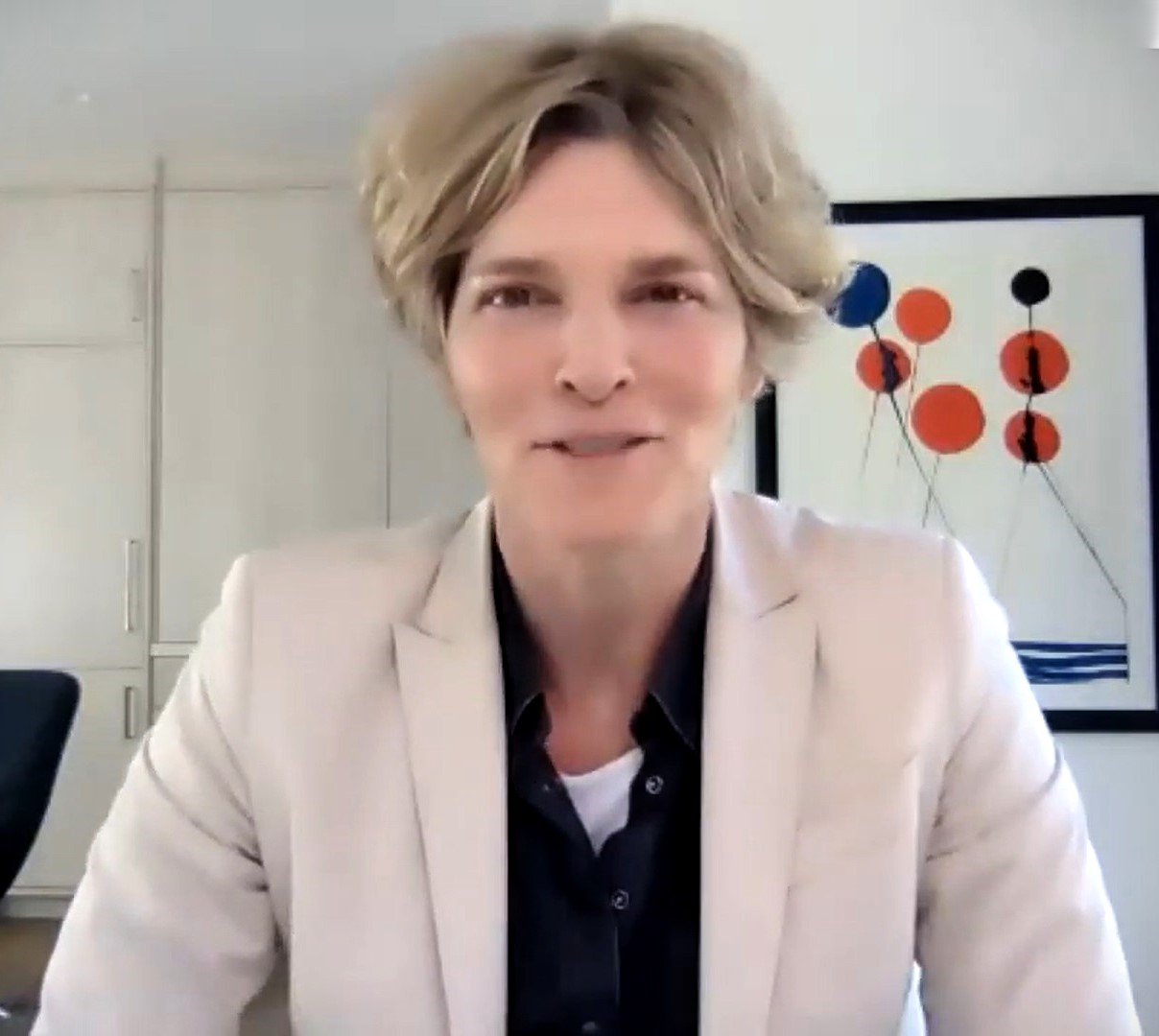
- Freeman in 2021
- Born: 1964 (age 61–62)

Academic background
- Education: Stanford University (BA); University of Toronto (LLB); Harvard University (LLM, SJD)

Academic work
- Institutions: Harvard Law School
- Main interests: Administrative law Environmental law
- Website: www.jodyfreeman.com

Jody Freeman (born 1964) is a Canadian-born American legal scholar at Harvard Law School in administrative law and environmental law. From 2009 to 2010, she was Counselor for Energy and Climate Change in the Obama White House.

Freeman has been a member of the Administrative Conference of the United States, the American Academy of Arts and Sciences, and the Council on Foreign Relations. She was also an independent director of ConocoPhillips and a member of the Electric Power Research Institute's advisory council.

== Early life and education ==
Freeman was raised in Vancouver, British Columbia. She earned a Bachelor of Arts degree from Stanford University in 1985, and a Bachelor of Laws degree from the University of Toronto in 1989. She went on to Master of Laws and Doctor of Juridical Science degrees from Harvard Law School, which she received in 1991 and 1995, respectively.

== Career ==
In 1990–91, she clerked at the Ontario Court of Appeal for a panel of judges including future Canadian Supreme Court Justice and UN High Commissioner Louise Arbour. From 1995 to 2005, Freeman was a professor of law at UCLA, where she co-founded the Environmental Law Program and was an award-winning teacher. From 2001 to 2004, Freeman also taught environmental law and served as Associate Dean for Law and Policy at the Bren School of Environmental Science & Management at UCSB.

She has been a visiting professor at Georgetown Law Center, New York University Law School, and Stanford Law School.

In 2005, Freeman joined the Harvard Law School faculty. She was one of a number of hires made during Elena Kagan's tenure as Dean. In 2006, she founded Harvard's Environmental and Energy Law and Policy program, a legal "think tank" for climate and energy policy analysis, and established an environmental law clinic.

In 2006, Freeman authored an amicus brief on behalf of former United States Secretary of State Madeleine Albright in Massachusetts v. Environmental Protection Agency, the global warming case decided by the Supreme Court in 2007.

From 2009 to 2010, she served as Counselor for Energy and Climate Change in the Obama White House.

In 2015, she and her colleague Richard Lazarus co-authored an amicus brief on behalf of William D. Ruckelshaus and William K. Reilly, former Administrators of the Environmental Protection Agency, supporting the government in the litigation over the Obama administration's Clean Power Plan.

== Board service and memberships ==
Freeman currently serves on the Climate Advisory Board of Norges Bank Investment Management, the asset manager of the Norwegian sovereign wealth fund.

She has served as a member of the Administrative Conference of the United States, a body that advises the federal government on how to improve the regulatory and administrative process. She is a member of the American Academy of Arts and Sciences, of the American College of Environmental Lawyers, and of the Council on Foreign Relations.

Freeman formerly served as an independent director of ConocoPhillips, and as a member of the advisory council of the Electric Power Research Institute.

=== ConocoPhillips ===
In light of the approval of the Willow project and her research grant from Harvard's Salata Institute in 2023 to review corporate net zero targets, scrutiny of Freeman's role as an independent director of the ConocoPhillips board increased. The Guardian described emails allegedly showing that she had facilitated a meeting between ConocoPhillips executives and a director at the Securities and Exchange Commission (SEC) in 2021 without disclosing her conflict of interest in a way that fully complied with university policy. The Harvard Faculty Divest steering committee, a group of professors seeking to end fossil fuel use, sent a letter to president Claudine Gay and vice provost for climate and sustainability James H. Stock expressing their concerns about a potential conflict between Freeman's responsibility to ConocoPhillips and the university's climate commitments. The student activist group Fossil Fuel Divest Harvard published an open letter asking her to resign from the company's board. The group acknowledged Freeman's climate work but criticized her effectiveness in "helping reform ConocoPhillips from the inside" and specifically referenced the Willow project. Additionally, a group of former students from one of her classes at Harvard Law School wrote an open letter to Freeman. While stating they admired her "proven dedication to achieving environmental justice", they asked her to sever her relationship with ConocoPhillips.

Freeman defended her position, calling her engagement with ConocoPhillips "positive" in helping move the industry towards a low-carbon future. She explained that she had made an introduction to ConocoPhillips on behalf of her Harvard colleague John Coates, who was an incoming SEC director and sought input from ConocoPhillips to educate himself on industry views as he addressed climate issues at the commission. Coates issued a statement in which he stated that he knew about Freeman's role at ConocoPhillips, that he initiated the conversation, and that Freeman did not "lobby" him or other SEC personnel. Freeman said her actions did not violate rules and that her role at ConocoPhillips was "common knowledge" at Harvard. Her Harvard colleague Richard Lazarus agreed, saying there was "absolutely no conflict of interest" with her board role. Norm Eisen, a government ethics specialist with the Brookings Institution, told The Washington Post: "From an ethics perspective nobody has pointed to a specific violation here. It's ethical. Whether it's virtuous or not is a genuine question for other authorities to debate."

Freeman resigned from the ConocoPhillips board in August 2023. In a statement, she said she would focus on her research at Harvard and pursue new opportunities, including a book about environmental challenges and ideas for further progress.

== Selected bibliography ==
=== Co-author ===
- —; Farber, Daniel A. (2006). Cases and Materials on Environmental Law. Thomson/West. ISBN 9780314908834.
- —; Kolstad, Charles D. (2007). Moving to markets in environmental regulation: lessons from twenty years of experience. Oxford University Press. OCLC 79857125.
- —; Minow, Martha (February 28, 2009). Government by Contract: Outsourcing and American Democracy. Harvard University Press. ISBN 9780674032088.
- —; Diver, Colin S.; Beermann, Jack M.; Cass, Ronald A. (February 2, 2020). Administrative Law: Cases and Materials. Aspen Publishing. ISBN 9781543804423.

=== Co-editor ===
- —; Gerrard, Michael, eds. (2014). Global Climate Change and U.S. Law. American Bar Association. ISBN 9781639052196.
- —; Graham, John D.; Konisky, David M.; Barnes, A. James, eds. (February 15, 2021). "The EPA and Climate Change". Fifty Years at the US Environmental Protection Agency: Progress, Retrenchment, and Opportunities. Rowman & Littlefield. ISBN 978-1538147146.
