= Williston Negotiation Competition =

Annual negotiation and contract drafting competition

The Williston Negotiation Competition is an annual negotiation and contract drafting competition at Harvard Law School for the 1L class.

Students work in paired teams of two, with each team representing a side in a complex business deal. At the end of the competition, each pair of teams submits a single contract, and each side submits a private memo to its client explaining why the client should accept the agreement.

The competition is judged by experienced negotiators from private practice and the Harvard Program on Negotiation. Teams are evaluated on three basic factors: value creation, value claiming, and contract drafting. Prizes are awarded to the team pairing that produces the best overall agreement as well as the two teams that best represent the interests of their respective sides in the negotiation.

The competition, which debuted in 1957, honors Samuel Williston, professor at Harvard Law School from 1895 to 1938 and author of a classic treatise on contracts. After running consistently for decades, the competition lapsed for a period of time before a 2025 revival for its 63rd iteration, hosted by editors of the Harvard Business Law Review.

== Winners ==
- 2025
  - Best overall contract: Emily Irigoyen, Amanda Ljustina, Philippa Marks, Claire Rider
  - Best representation of Williston Airlines: Liz Kim and Alex Siegenthaler
  - Best representation of Langdell Association of Flight Attendants: Quincy Martin and Tatianna Poggi
- 2014
  - Best overall contract: Ilan Stein, David Victorson, Albert Chen and Petra Plasilova
  - Best representation of Hanford School of Law: Thomas Chapman and Jonathan Holbrook
  - Best representation of Committee on Outside Activities: Andres Caicedo and Alice Nofzinger
- 2013
  - Best overall contract:Sasha Pippenger, Elizabeth Nehrling, Sarah Paige and Jennifer Garnett
  - Best representation of Airlines: Natalie Rad and Tara Norris
  - Best representation of Flight Attendants: Aaron Blacksberg and David Salant
- 2012
  - Best overall contract, representing Hanford School of Law: Aseem Padukone and Stella Unruh
  - Best overall contract, representing Committee on Outside Activities: Andrew Sullivan and Patrick Brown
  - Best representation of Hanford School of Law: Nikolas Bowie and Addar Weintraub
  - Best representation of Committee on Outside Activities: Annie Kim and Sara Canby
- 2011
  - Best overall contract, representing Boston: Graham Phillips and Lisa Ma
  - Best overall contract, representing Fresh Air: Ruchi Desai and Megan Riley
  - Best representation of Boston: Andrew Cath Rubenstein and Doug Smith
  - Best representation of Fresh Air: Matthew Aldana and Benjamin Freeman
- 2010
  - Best overall contract, representing Save Our Square: Kristi Jobson and Aaron Dalnoot
  - Best overall contract, representing McMillin’s: Russell Herman and David Roth
  - Best representation of Save Our Square: Fentress Jamal Fulton and Betny Anne Townsend
  - Best representation of McMillin’s: Adam David Lander and Matthew Nicholas Walsh
- 2009
  - Best overall contract, representing River Red: Neil Chatani and Brian Kozlowski
  - Best overall contract, representing Mountain Blue: Jay Schweikert and David Carpman
  - Best representation of River Red: Amir Ali and Taylor Ashley
  - Best representation of Mountain Blue: Sarah Jelsema, Danielle Mirabal and Ian Brooks
- 2008
- 2007
  - Best overall contract: Mary-Hunter Morris and Sean McDonnell; and Evan Simpson and Harry Drozdowski
  - Best negotiators: David Kessler and Trevor Cox; and Avery Day and G. J. Ligelis
- 2004
  - Best overall contract, representing Boston: Karl Chang and Mitchell Webber
  - Best overall contract, representing Fresh Air Airlines: Erin Abrams and Alex Grinberg
  - Best representation of Boston: Stephanie Coon and Heather Ford
  - Best representation of Fresh Air Airlines: William Fay and Erik Zwicker
- 2002
  - First Prize and Best Negotiators, representing the airline: Patrick S. Chung and Aman F. Kapadia
- 1995
  - Best overall contract, representing McMillin’s: Andrew Kim and Clarence Mah
- 1989
  - Best overall contract, Jacqueline Fuchs and David Rockwell Jackie Fox, Doug Rappaport and Jeff Taylor
  - Best representation of athlete, Ellen Bublick and Dave Deakin
- 1982
  - Best Overall Contract, Frances Horner, Anita Allen, Susan McCafferty, and Jonathan Sanchez Haimen

== Notable Winners ==
- Jonathan Zittrain
- Mary Hunter (Morris) McDonnell (Wharton Professor)
- Lloyd Blankfein
- Adrian Vermeule
- Jackie Fuchs a/k/a Jackie Fox
- Lorin Reisner (1983)
- Alan Tse (1995)
