= Christopher T. Robertson =

- Born: 1975 (age 50–51); United States
- Education: Southeast Missouri State University B.A. Washington University in St. Louis Ph.D. Harvard Law School J.D.
- Occupations: Professor and Associate Dean for Research and Innovation; Founder, Regulatory Science Program
- Employer: Boston University
- Known for: Bioethics & law; health law;
- Website: Christopher Robertson Boston University faculty page

Christopher Tarver Robertson is a specialist in health law working at the intersection of law, philosophy and science. His research explores how the law affects decision making in domains of scientific uncertainty and misaligned incentives, which he calls "institutional epistemology." Robertson is professor, N. Neal Pike Scholar, and Associate Dean at Boston University. He is affiliated faculty with the Petrie Flom Center for Health Care Policy, Bioethics and Biotechnology at Harvard Law School. His work includes tort law, bioethics, the First Amendment, and corruption in healthcare and politics. His legal practice has focused on complex litigation involving medical and scientific disputes.

== Background and education ==
In 1997, Robertson attended Southeast Missouri State University, obtaining a B.A. in Philosophy. During his senior year he interned for the White House Chief of Staff, Erskine Bowles. He went on to earn a Ph.D. in Philosophy at Washington University in St. Louis and taught Bio-Medical Ethics before attending Harvard Law School, earning his J.D., in 2007. In 2008, he continued at Harvard Law as an Academic Fellow & Lecturer at the Petrie-Flom Center for Health Law Policy, Biotechnology, and Bioethics. Upon completing his fellowship, in 2010, he became a tenure-track professor at the University of Arizona and was tenured as a full professor in 2015. As a visitor, he has also taught at London School of Economics, New York University, and Harvard Law School.

== Research and publications ==
Robertson has co-edited two books: Nudging Health: Behavioral Economics and Health Law (2016, with Holly Fernandez Lynch and Glenn Cohen) and Blinding as a Solution to Bias: Strengthening Biomedical Science, Forensic Science and Law (2016, with Aaron Kesselheim). In 2019, Harvard University Press published his monograph Exposed: Why Our Health Insurance is Incomplete and What Can be Done About It.

In addition to his books, Robertson has written articles for legal and healthcare journals including the New England Journal of Medicine; Yale Journal of Health Policy, Law and Ethics, Journal of Legal Analysis, Journal of Law and Bioscience, Journal of Empirical Legal Studies, New York University Law Review, Cornell Law Review, and Journal of the American College of Radiology. He has given interviews, been published and cited in media outlets including CBS News, CNN,The Washington Post, The Wall Street Journal, and National Public Radio's Marketplace.

Robertson has received research support from the Edmond J. Safra Center for Ethics at Harvard, the Greenwall Foundation, the National Institutes of Health and the Robert Wood Johnson Foundation.
