= Richard Lazarus (disambiguation) =

Richard Lazarus (1922–2002) was an American psychologist

Richard Lazarus may also refer to:

- Richard Lazarus (law professor)
- Professor Richard Lazarus, Doctor Who villain
