= Wendy Jacobs =

American climate lawyer (1956–2021)

Wendy Carol Jacobs
- Born: 1956
- Died: 2021 (aged 64–65)

Academic background
- Education: Harvard University

Wendy Carol Jacobs (1956–2021) was an American climate lawyer who founded the Harvard Law School Environmental Law and Policy Clinic. She dedicated her career to environmental policy and legal education.

== Early life and education ==
Jacobs trained at Harvard Law School. Whilst she had initially intended to specialize in international law, she became concerned about the impact of the environment on citizens' health. She was at law school when people living close to the Love Canal were exposed to chemical waste, which gave rise to birth defects and ill health amongst the community. She documented the injustice in the Harvard Law Review. After graduating, Jacobs worked for a law firm in Seattle.

== Career ==
Jacobs spent most of her career at Foley Hoag, a law firm in Boston. She focused on legal policy to tackle climate change, and worked as a litigator in the Land and Natural Resources Division of the United States Department of Justice. She joined Harvard Law School in 2007, where she established an environmental law clinic. She focused on environmental protection policies and energy law.

Jacobs created the Climate Solutions Living Lab, a research course that developed environmental legislature for American communities. In the wake of Donald Trump's election as president, Jacobs wrote a manual on how to use citizen science data in litigation. The manual outlined best practice and provided information on designing and delivering an environmentally focused climate change project. The manual provides information on the law governing citizen science in different American states. She provided Harvard students with opportunities to defend policies that protect the environment, such as Roderick Bremby's denial of an application for coal-fired power plants.

Jacobs was made Chair of the Clean Air Task Force in 2018.

In 2021, Jacobs fought against Trump's proposed Transparency Rule, a regulation that would have allowed the United States Environmental Protection Agency to require researchers to publish their raw data, meaning that medical information could not inform climate policy.

== Selected publications ==
- Sunderland, Elsie; Driscoll, Charles; Hammitt, James; Grandjean, Philippe; John S Evans; Blum, Joel; Celia Y Chen; David C Evers; Daniel A Jaffe; Mason, Robert; Shaun Goho; Wendy Jacobs (2016). "Benefits of Regulating Hazardous Air Pollutants from Coal and Oil-Fired Utilities in the United States". Environmental Science & Technology. 50 (5): 2117–2120. doi:10.1021/acs.est.6b00239. PMID 26848613. Wikidata Q35915385.
- Salas, Renee N.; Jacobs, Wendy; Perera, Frederica (2019-05-30). "The Case of Juliana v. U.S. — Children and the Health Burdens of Climate Change". New England Journal of Medicine. 380 (22): 2085–2087. doi:10.1056/NEJMp1905504. ISSN 0028-4793. PMID 31141628. S2CID 205115062.
- Jacobs, Wendy; Craig, Michael (2019-03-01). "Carbon Capture and Sequestration". Rochester, NY. SSRN 3401895.

== Personal life ==
Jacobs was never married, and had two daughters. She died in 2021.
