= Jacob Gersen =

American legal scholar

- Title: Sidley Austin Professor of Law
- Spouse: Jeannie Suk Gersen

Academic background
- Education: Brown University (BA); University of Chicago (MA, PhD, JD)

Jacob E. Gersen is an American legal scholar. He is the Sidley Austin Professor of Law and affiliate professor in the Department of Government at Harvard University, where he has taught since 2011. Among Gersen's specialties are administrative law, food law, and regulation. He is the founder and director of the Harvard Food Law Lab.

== Early life and education ==
Gersen was raised in central Maine. His father worked as a bookseller.

Gersen graduated magna cum laude with a Bachelor of Arts in public policy from Brown University in 1996. He received an M.A. and Ph.D. in political science from the University of Chicago in 1998 and 2001. He completed a J.D. at the University of Chicago Law School in 2004.

== Career ==
After clerking for Stephen F. Williams of the U.S. Court of Appeals for the District of Columbia from 2004 to 2005, Gersen returned to the University of Chicago Law School as an assistant professor. He was appointed full professor in 2010. Gersen served as the Samuel Williston Visiting Assistant Professor of Law at Harvard Law School in 2009. He joined the Harvard Law faculty in 2011.

== Personal life ==
Gersen is married to Jeannie Suk Gersen, who likewise teaches at Harvard Law School.
