= HBLR =

HBLR may refer to:

- Harvard Business Law Review
- Hudson–Bergen Light Rail
