= Harvard Business Law Review =

Business focused legal journal

- Abbreviation: HBLR
- Formation: 2009
- Type: Harvard Law School student journal
- Legal status: Non-Profit
- Purpose: Publishing on the intersection of law and business
- Headquarters: Cambridge, Massachusetts
- Location: 1585 Massachusetts Ave., Cambridge, MA 02138
- Region served: United States
- Website: www.hblr.org

The Harvard Business Law Review (HBLR) is a bi-annual legal journal published at Harvard Law School. It covers subjects including: corporate governance, securities law, capital markets, financial regulation and institutions, financial distress and bankruptcy, and related subjects.

While being run and published by students, the Harvard Business Law Review has an advisory board consisting of a number of tenured Professors at Harvard Law School, including Lucian Bebchuk, Mark J. Roe, Guhan Subramanian, and also practitioners, including Paul N. Watterson Jr., Elizabeth M. Schubert, and Warren Motley.

The Review expanded between 2024 and 2025 under presidents Joseph Ravenna IV and Savannah G. Huitema, opening membership to Harvard Business School students. With the American Law Institute, it hosted a symposium on the Restatement of the Law, Consumer Contracts, publishing a corresponding special issue. The journal also hosted the 63rd Williston Competition, which had been dormant for a decade.
