= Deborah Anker =

American legal scholar

- Education: Brandeis University, Northeastern University Law School, Harvard
- Occupations: Law scholar and Professor
- Years active: 1975-present
- Known for: Harvard Law School Immigration and Refugee Clinical Program
- Notable work: Law of Asylum in the United States

Deborah Eve Anker is an American professor of law and director of the Harvard Law School Immigration and Refugee Clinical Program, which she co-founded in 1984. The HIRC is a clinical and academic program that engages students in representation, and teaches institutional context, legal doctrine and theory. She has been a Harvard academic for over 35 years. Anker is the author of the treatise, Law of Asylum in the United States, and she has co-drafted gender asylum guidelines and amicus curiae briefs. Her scholarly work on asylum is widely cited, frequently by international and domestic courts and tribunals, including the United States Supreme Court.

In 2014 the First Circuit Court of Appeals overturned a Board of Immigration Appeals decision denying asylum to a Guatemalan Mayan Quiche Indian, for which the HIRC wrote a brief. In August of the same year, the Board of Immigration Appeals recognized domestic violence as grounds for seeking asylum in the US, with Anker and the HIRC having written the amicus brief in that decision, in the case of Matter of A-R-C-G-. In June 2015, Anker received the Arthur C. Helton Human Rights Award from the American Immigration Lawyers Association "in recognition of outstanding service in advancing the cause of human rights".

She graduated magna cum laude from Brandeis University, and received a J.D. from the Northeastern University Law School. She also has a Master of Law degree and Master of Arts and Teaching degree from Harvard. She is a Fellow of the American Bar Foundation.

Her father, Irving Anker, was a New York City Schools Chancellor during desegregation. Her mother, Sara R. Anker, was a history teacher at Martin Van Buren High School in Queens Village. Deborah Anker married Alan Nogee and has a son with him.

== Bar admissions ==
- Massachusetts Supreme Judicial Court, 1975
- United States District Court for the District of Massachusetts, 1976
- United States Court of Appeals for the First Circuit, 1980
- United States Court of Appeals for the Ninth Circuit, 1987
- United States Supreme Court, 1993

== Selected bibliography ==
- Anker, Deborah E. Law of Asylum in the United States, 2015 Edition (Thompson-Reuters).
- Anker, Deborah; Lawrence, P (October 2014). "Third Generation" Gangs, Warfare in Central America, and Refugee Law's Political Opinion Ground" (PDF). Immigr. Briefings. Briefings 1: 10–14.
- Anker, Deborah E. "2 Legal change from the bottom up." Gender in Refugee Law: From the Margins to the Centre (2014): 46.ISBN 978-0-415-83942-6
- Anker, Deborah E. "Grutter V. Bollinger: Justice Ruth Bader Ginsburg's Legitimization of the Role of Comparative and International Law in US Jurisprudence." Harvard Law Review 127.1 (2013): 425.
- Anker, Deborah E., Nancy Kelly, John Willshire Carrera & Sabrineh Ardalan. "Mejilla-Romero: A New Era For Child Asylum," 12-09 Immigration Briefings, Thompson-Reuters 1 (2012). ISSN 1042-0703
- Anker, Deborah E. Law of Asylum in the United States, 7th Edition, Thomson-Reuters (2014).ISBN 978-0-966-51491-9
- Anker, Deborah E. & Sabrineh Ardalan. "Escalating Persecution of Gays and Refugee Protection: Comment on Queer Cases Make Bad Law," 44 N.Y.U. Journal of International Law and Politics 529 (2012).
- Anker, Deborah E. "Refugee law, gender, and the human rights paradigm."Harv. Hum. Rts. J. 15 (2002): 133. ISSN1057-5057
