= Samuel Williston =

American lawyer

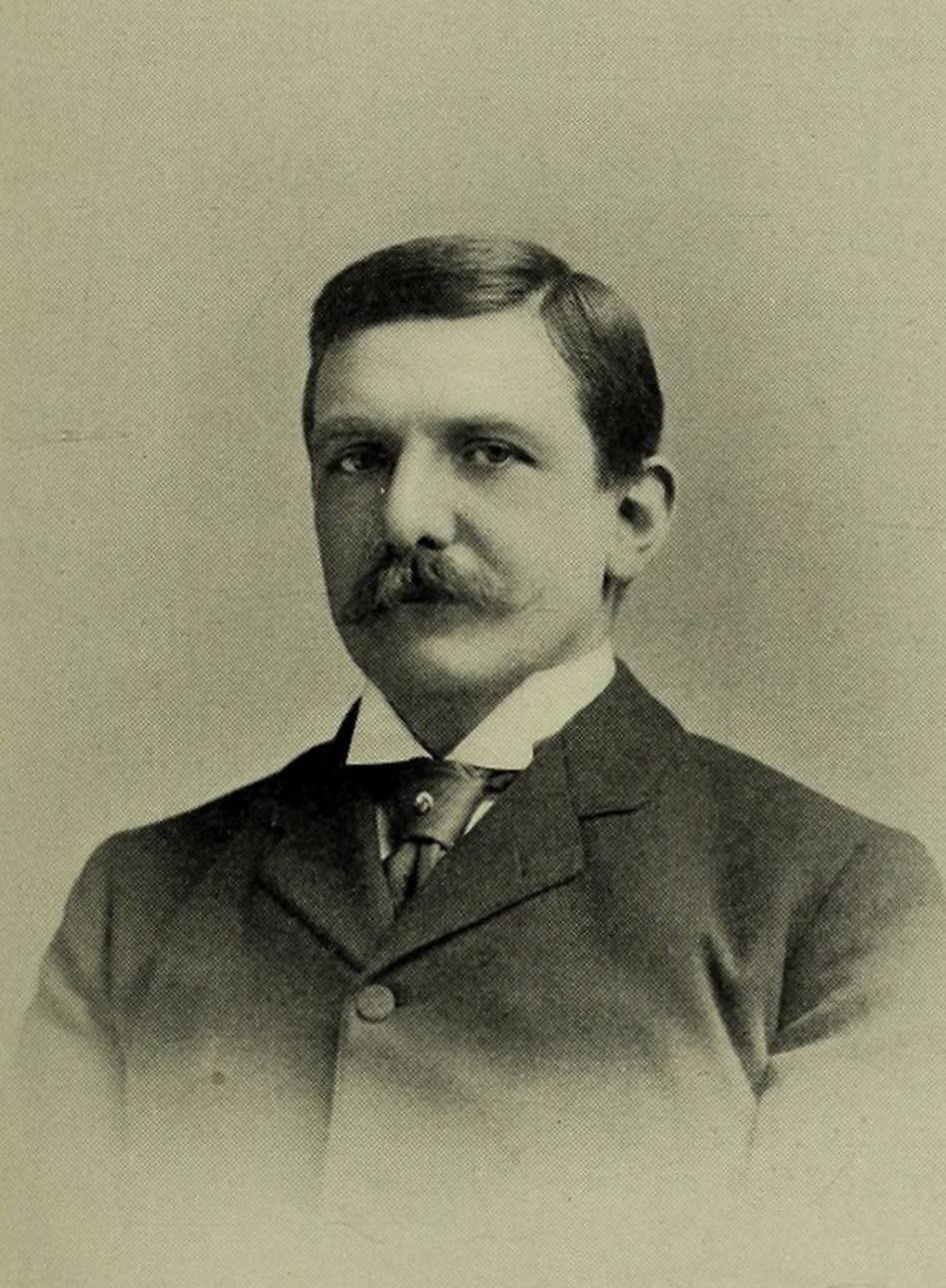
- Born: September 24, 1861; Cambridge, Massachusetts, U.S.
- Died: February 18, 1963 (aged 101); Cambridge, Massachusetts, U.S.
- Education: Harvard University (AB, LLB, AM)
- Known for: Treatise on contract law urging formalism Promissory estoppel
- Scientific career
- Workplaces: Harvard Law School
- Notable students: Felix Frankfurter, Learned Hand, Henry Friendly

Samuel Williston (September 24, 1861 – February 18, 1963) was an American lawyer and law professor who authored an influential treatise on contracts.

== Early life, education and family ==
Williston was born in Cambridge, Massachusetts, to a family prosperous from the mercantile trade but whose fortunes declined during his youth, which he recalled, "served as a spur to endeavor."

He graduated from Harvard College in 1882 and worked for three years as a survey assistant for a railroad and teaching at a boarding school. An aunt's bequest enabled him to enroll in Harvard Law School, where he thrived. He was an editor of the first volume of the Harvard Law Review, and in 1888 he graduated first in his class with LL.B. and A.M. degrees.

On September 12, 1889, he married Mary Fairlie Wellman, who died in 1929. They had two daughters: Dorothea Lewis Williston (Mrs. Murray F. Hall), and Margaret Fairlie Williston (Mrs. Chester B. McLaughlin, Jr.).

== Legal career ==
Early in Williston's career, from 1888 to 1889 he worked as the private secretary to U.S. Supreme Court Justice Horace Gray. In the summer of 1889, he helped to collate laws from various U.S. states in order to help formulate the state constitutions of North Dakota and South Dakota.

From 1895 to 1938, Williston was a law professor at Harvard Law School, and in 1910, he briefly served as acting dean. In 1903, he was named Weld Professor and, in 1919, was named to the Dane Professorship at Harvard. Students described him as "a gentle, good-humored teacher who charmed his classes with hypothetical cases involving his horse, Dobbin, and who regularly invited students to dine with his family on Sundays," and "a master of the Socratic method."

Amongst his most important contributions at this time were the drafting of four laws aimed at providing national commerce with a legally uniform architecture. The Uniform Laws of Sales (1906), Warehouse Receipts (1906), Bills of Lading (1909), and Stock Transfers (1909) would in fact serve as precedents for the construction of the Uniform Commercial Code some decades later.

The Uniform Commercial Code corrected defects in the Uniform Sales Act, such as the Uniform Sales Act's reliance on title to determine which party (the buyer or the seller) bore the risk of loss. The UCC prescribed rules which allocate the risk of loss that do not depend on the location of title. The need to determine title under the Uniform Sales Act often led to expensive and protracted litigation which the Uniform Commercial Code has eliminated.

On December 10 and 11, 1913, Williston unsuccessfully argued for the defense in the case of Boston & Maine Railroad v. Hooker before the U.S. Supreme Court. He became a consultant for the Boston law firm Hale & Dorr, during which time he was involved in cases such as Kneeland v. American Loan Trust Company and Chase National Bank v. Sayles.

== Treatise on contracts ==
Williston wrote five volumes of his legal treatise, "The Law of Contracts", which was first published during the span of 1920 to 1922. The treatise was widely acclaimed as the foremost authority on the topic and was later enlarged in 1938. As Michael Looney noted in the Boston College Law Review (of the 3rd edition): "In the forty years since the original edition appeared, it has gained a pre-eminent place in that field. Quoted or cited by the courts of the United States, Great Britain, and its Dominions as well, it has become the standard authority."

In 1932, Williston served as reporter for the First Restatement of Contracts, a highly influential publication in the legal community. This treatise continues to exist to this day, currently edited by Richard A. Lord, professor at Campbell University Norman Adrian Wiggins School of Law, although it has been superseded by the Restatement (Second) Contracts, and the Restatement (Second) effectively has been modified by the Uniform Commercial Code.

== Honors and legacy ==
Williston received accolades both during his lifetime and at the time of his death. In 1905, Williston was made a fellow of the American Academy of Arts and Sciences. He was awarded honorary degrees by Harvard, 1910; Amherst, 1923; and Yale, 1926. In 1929, he was honored with the very first American Bar Association Medal for "conspicuous service to American jurisprudence."

In a 1963 Harvard Law Review essay, Justice Felix Frankfurter lauded Williston as being the "greatest artist in teaching." His statement of rules helped make commercial law predictable: "The business life of this nation is based on the writings and the legislation that Samuel Williston drafted," said Harvard Law Professor Arthur E. Sutherland.

He, his work and his insistence on contractual formalism are often compared and contrasted to those of Yale Law School professor Arthur Linton Corbin, developer of the philosophy of law known as legal realism. Corbin was the writer of Corbin on Contracts and his influence is more evident in the Uniform Commercial Code and the Restatement (Second) of Contracts.

He lived to 101 years of age in spite of ill health in his mid-thirties that interfered with his teaching.

Williston is the namesake of the Williston Negotiation Competition at Harvard Law School.

== See also ==
- List of law clerks for the second seat of the Supreme Court of the United States
