= Louis Loss =

American lawyer (1914–1997)

Louis Loss (June 11, 1914 – December 13, 1997) was an American legal scholar. He was considered to be the intellectual father of modern securities law. He served as the William Nelson Cromwell Professor of Law Emeritus at Harvard Law School. He is best known for his treatise Securities Regulation, which is still considered to be the definitive authority on the subject and which has been cited over 50 times by the Supreme Court of the United States. The Oxford English Dictionary credits him with having coined the word tippee, to refer to someone who trades stock after getting a tip from a corporate insider.

== Education and SEC career ==
Loss graduated from the University of Pennsylvania with a B.S. in 1934 and Yale Law School with his LL.B. in 1937. He was also granted an honorary A.M. from Harvard University in 1953. Upon his graduation from Yale, Loss joined the Securities and Exchange Commission, where he served as staff attorney from 1937 to 1944, chief counsel of the Division of Trading and Exchanges from 1944 to 1948, and associate general counsel from 1948 to 1952. While at the SEC, he helped develop the initial theories that enabled the Securities and Exchange Commission to use the broadly worded anti-fraud provisions of the securities law to prosecute insider trading, an area not directly addressed by the law itself.

== Career as a law professor ==
Loss held part-time teaching positions at Wharton School of Finance of University of Pennsylvania, Yale Law School and George Washington University Law School before joining the faculty of Harvard Law School in 1952. He served as Professor of Law from 1952 to 1962 and William Nelson Cromwell Professor of Law from 1962 to 1984. During his tenure at Harvard, he was offered the chairmanship of the SEC by President John F. Kennedy, but he declined. He became William Nelson Cromwell Professor of Law Emeritus in 1984. Among his many students at Harvard were U.S. Supreme Court Justices Kennedy, Ginsburg, Scalia, and Souter. Though lacking dynamism as a lecturer, he remained one of the most popular and admired professors among Harvard Law School students as well as among faculty. He also served as director of the Harvard Law School Program of Instruction for Lawyers from 1977 to 1984. In academic year 1986/1987 Loss spent his final year teaching as a visiting professor at University of Pennsylvania Law School. After his death, Volume 111 #8 of the Harvard Law Review was dedicated to him. Loss' wife, Bernice, served as Curator of the Harvard Law School art collection, which includes dozens of paintings of English and American jurists.
