= Elisabeth Owens =

- Born: May 15, 1919
- Died: November 15, 1998 (aged 79)

Elisabeth Owens (May 15, 1919 – November 15, 1998) was an American legal scholar. In 1972 she was the first woman to be granted tenure at Harvard Law School.
