= Gerald L. Neuman =

Gerald L. Neuman is J. Sinclair Armstrong Professor of International, Foreign, and Comparative Law at Harvard Law School. He was previously Herbert Wechsler Professor of Federal Jurisprudence at Columbia Law School.

He is an expert on international human rights law, comparative constitutional law, and immigration and nationality law.

Prof. Neuman was elected to the United Nations Human Rights Committee in September 2010 and served on the Committee until December 2014.

He graduated from Harvard College, Harvard Law School and earned a PhD in Mathematics from the Massachusetts Institute of Technology in 1977.
