= Robert Sitkoff =

Robert H. Sitkoff (born 1974) is the Austin Wakeman Scott Professor of Law and the John L. Gray Professor of Law at Harvard Law School, where he specializes in trusts and estates. He previously served as professor of law at New York University School of Law and Northwestern University School of Law.

Sitkoff's scholarly work focuses on trusts and estates, a field of law with relatively few prominent scholars. He is co-author of Wills, Trusts, and Estates, the leading trusts and estates casebook in the United States; has published in leading academic journals such as the Yale Law Journal, Columbia Law Review, and the Journal of Law and Economics; has appeared as a commentator on CNN; and has had his work on the effects of the abolition of the rule against perpetuities featured in The Wall Street Journal.

== Education and Clerkship ==
Sitkoff received a B.A. from University of Virginia in 1996, and a J.D. from University of Chicago Law School with high honors in 1999. He was a law clerk for Judge Richard Posner on the United States Court of Appeals for the Seventh Circuit from 1999 to 2000.

== Career ==
In 2000, Sitkoff became a professor at Northwestern University School of Law. In 2006, he moved to New York University, and the next year joined the Harvard faculty. At the time, Harvard Law School dean Elena Kagan said that he was "doing the most exciting and important academic work in trust and estates that anyone has seen in years." He is known for his work in economic and empirical analysis of trusts, estates, and fiduciary administration.

=== Law Reform Work ===
Sitkoff was elected to the American Law Institute (ALI) in 2007 and was elected to a five-year term on the ALI's Council in May 2012. He has worked on several ALI projects, including Principles of the Law of Charitable Nonprofit Organizations; Restatement Third, Property (Wills and Other Donative Transfers), Restatement Third, Restitution and Unjust Enrichment, and Restatement Third, Trusts.

== Personal ==
Sitkoff's father is a retired trusts and estates lawyer. He married his wife Tamara in 2003 with their rabbi and Judge Richard Posner jointly officiating. They have three children.

== Works ==
- Sitkoff, Robert H. (2020). "Reconciling Fiduciary Duty and Social Conscience: The Law and Economics of ESG Investing by a Trustee" (PDF). Stanford Law Review. 72.
- Sitkoff, Robert H. (2005). "Jurisdictional Competition for Trust Funds: An Empirical Analysis of Perpetuities and Taxes" (PDF). The Yale Law Journal. 115.
- Sitkoff, Robert H. (2004). "An Agency Costs Theory of Trust Law". Cornell Law Review. 89 (3).
