= Guhan Subramanian =

American lawyer and economist

Guhan Subramanian is an American lawyer and economist, focusing in corporate law and finance, dispute resolution and negotiations and dealmaking, currently the Joseph Flom Professor of Law and Business at Harvard Law School and Douglas Weaver Professor of Business Law at Harvard Business School. Born in Rajasthan, India, Subramanian is the first Asian-American member of the Harvard Law School's tenured faculty.
