= I. Glenn Cohen =

Canadian scholar and professor (born 1978)

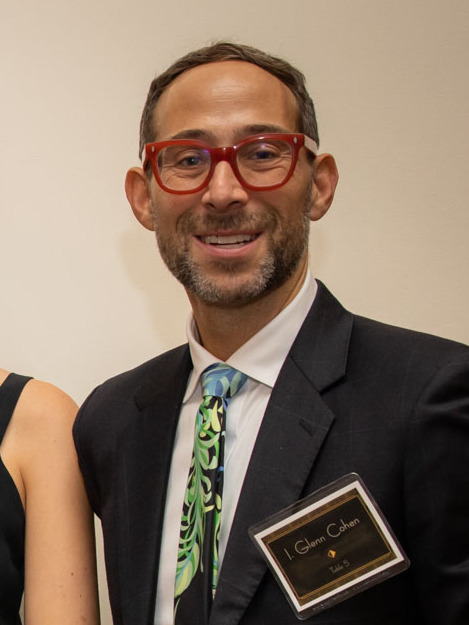
- Cohen in 2022
- Born: 1978 (age 47–48); Montreal, Quebec, Canada
- Education: University of Toronto (BA); Harvard University (JD)
- Occupations: Professor; Director, Petrie-Flom Center for Health Law Policy, Biotechnology, and Bioethics; Associate Member, Broad Institute
- Employer: Harvard Law School
- Known for: Bioethics & law; health law; medical tourism, reproductive technology
- Website: I. Glenn Cohen. Harvard Law School Faculty Page

Ivan Glenn Cohen (born 1978) is a Canadian legal scholar and professor at Harvard Law School. He is also the director of Harvard Law School's Petrie-Flom Center for Health Law Policy, Biotechnology, and Bioethics.

== Education and early career ==
After graduating from Bialik High School in 1996, Cohen attended the University of Toronto where he received an Hon. B.A. in Bioethics (Philosophy) and Psychology in 2000. He served as a Primary Editor on the Harvard Law Review and published two student notes. He received his J.D., magna cum laude, in 2003.

He served as a law clerk for Judge Michael Boudin of the United States Court of Appeals for the First Circuit from 2003–2004 and then worked on the Appellate Staff in the Civil Division of the United States Department of Justice from 2004-2006.

== Academic career ==
In 2006, Cohen returned to Harvard as an Academic Fellow & Lecturer On Law at the Petrie-Flom Center for Health Law Policy, Biotechnology, and Bioethics. Upon completing his fellowship, in 2008, Cohen became a tenure-track professor at Harvard Law School and was tenured as a full professor in 2013. Cohen's work lies at the intersection of law and bioethics. His current projects focus on big data, health information technology, technology in medicine, telemedicine, rationing in law and medicine, FDA law, and medical tourism.

Cohen was selected as a Radcliffe Institute Fellow for the 2012-2013 year and is a fellow at the Hastings Center, one of the leading bioethics think tanks in the United States.

He is also one of the lead co-investigators in the NFL Football Players Health Study at Harvard. He spearheads the Ethics and Law initiative at Harvard Catalyst, an NIH-supported clinical and translation science initiative.

He is a board member of the Association of American Law Schools, Law, Medicine, and Health Care Section Executive Committee and served as a board member of the Institutional Review Board for Fenway Health from 2007-2010. He became co-editor-in-chief of The Journal of Law and the Biosciences in 2013 and has served as a peer reviewer in the New England Journal of Medicine and The Lancet.

Cohen has written a number of articles, appearing in journals such as the New England Journal of Medicine; JAMA; Cell; Nature; the Harvard, Stanford, Southern California, Minnesota, Iowa, and Hastings Law Reviews; the Harvard Journal of Law and Negotiation; the Harvard Journal of Law and Technology; the Food and Drug Law Journal; the Journal of Law, Medicine and Ethics; and the Hastings Center Reports. He has given interviews and been cited by the New York Times, Politico, CNN, ABC News, MSNBC, The Boston Globe, Mother Jones, NPR, PBS, and AOL News.

Cohen was elected a Member of the National Academy of Medicine in 2024.

== Books and chapters ==
- FDA in the Twenty-First Century: The Challenges of Regulating Drugs and New Technologies (co-edited with Holly Fernandez Lynch) (Columbia University Press 2016)
- From Medical Experimentation to Non-Medical Experimentation: What Can and Cannot be Learned from Medicine as to the Ethics of Legal and Other Non-Medical Experiments?, in Medical Experimentation: Personal Integrity and Social Policy, New Edition (2016) (Co-Authored with James D. Greiner)
- Nudging Health: Health Law and Behavioral Economics (2016) (Co-Edited with Holly Fernandez Lynch and Christopher T. Robertson)
- Sperm and Egg Donor Anonymity: Legal and Ethical Issues, in The Oxford Handbook of Reproductive Ethics (2015-2016)
- The Oxford Handbook of U.S. Health Care Law (2015-2016) (Co-Edited with Bill Sage and Allison Hoffman)
- Medical Tourism for Services Legal in the Home and Destination Country: Legal and Ethical Issues, in Bodies Across Borders: The Global Circulation of Body Parts, Medical tourists and Professionals (2015)
- Medical Tourism for Services Illegal in Patients’ Home Country, in Handbook on Medical Tourism and Patient Mobility (2015)
- Patients with Passports: Medical Tourism, Law, and Ethics (2014)
- Medical Tourism: Bioethical and Legal Issues, in Routledge Companion to Bioethics (2014)
- Was the Medicaid Expansion Coercive?, in The Affordable Care Act Decision: Philosophical and Legal Implications (2014)
- Human Subjects Research Regulation: Perspectives on the Future (2014) (Co-Edited with Holly Fernandez Lynch)
- Las Recientes Controversias sobre la Tecnología Reproductiva en los Estados Unidos, in I. Glenn Cohen & Ester Farnos Amorós, Derecho y tecnologías reproductivas (2014)
- Las Fronteras del Derecho Sanitario: Globalización y Turismo Médico, in Las Fronteras del Derecho Bio-sanitario, Anuario de la Facultad de Derecho de la Universidad Autónoma de Madrid (2014)
- The Globalization of Health Care: Legal and Ethical Challenges (Oxford University Press 2013) (editor, and contributing introduction and chapter)
- Medical Outlaws or Medical Refugees? An Examination of Circumvention Tourism, in Risks and Challenges in Medical Tourism: Understanding the Global Market for Health Services Controversies in the Exploding Industry of Global Medicine (2012)

== Selected publications ==
- Going Germline: Mitochondrial Replacement as a Guide to Genome Editing, Cell (2016) (Co-Authored with Eli Y. Adashi)
- Effect of a Legal Prime on Clinician's Assessment of Suicide Risk, Death Studies (2016) (Co-Authored with N.C. Berman, E.S. Tung, N. Matheny, and S. Wilhelm)
- Transatlantic Lessons in Regulation of Mitochondrial Replacement Therapy, Science (2015) (Co-Authored with Julian Savulescu & Eli Y. Adashi)
- My Body, My Bank, Texas Law Review (2015)
- Complexifying Commodification, Consumption, ART, and Abortion, Journal of Law, Medicine and Ethics (2015)
- Balancing Religious Freedom and Health Care Access, Lahey Health Journal of Medical Ethics (2015) (Co-Authored with Holly Fernandez Lynch)
- Make it Work! Breyer on Patents in the Life Sciences, Harvard Law Review (2014)
- The Legal and Ethical Concerns that Arise from Using Complex Predictive Analytics in Health Care, Health Affairs (2014) (Co-Authored with Bernard Lo, Ruben Amarasingham, Bin Xie, and Anand Shah)
- When Religious Freedom Clashes with Access to Care, New England Journal of Medicine (2014) (Co-Authored with Holly Fernandez Lynch & Gregory D. Curfman)
- Organs Without Borders? Allocating Transplant Organs, Foreign, and the Importance of the Nation State (?), Law and Contemporary Problems (2014) (symposium)
- Conscientious Objection, Coercion, the Affordable Care Act, and U.S. States, Ethical Perspectives (2013)
- Marking Residency Work Hours Rule Work, Journal of Law, Medicine, & Ethics (2013) (Co-Authored with Charles A. Czeisler and Christopher P. Landrigan)
- The Science, Fiction, and Science Fiction of Unsexed Motherhood, Online Symposium, Harvard Journal of Law & Gender Online (2012)
- Circumvention Tourism, Cornell Law Review (2012)
- Can the Government Ban Organ Sale? Recent Court Challenges and Future of U.S. Law on Selling Human Organs and Other Tissues, American Journal of Transplantation (2012)
- Medical Tourism, Access to Health Care, and Global Justice, Virginia Journal of International Law (2011)
- Prohibiting Anonymous Sperm Donation and the Child Welfare Error, Hastings Center Report (2011)
- Human Embryonic Stem-Cell Research Under Siege — Battle Won but Not the War, New England Journal of Medicine (2011)
- Fetal Pain, Abortion, Viability and the Constitution, Journal of Law, Medicine & Ethics (2011)(Co-Authored with Sadath Sayeed)
- Trading-Off Reproductive Technology and Adoption: Does Subsidizing IVF Decrease Adoption Rates and Should It Matter? Minnesota Law Review (2010) (Co-authored with Daniel Chen)
- Protecting Patients with Passports: Medical Tourism and the Patient-Protective Argument, Iowa Law Review (2010)
- Medical Tourism: The View from Ten Thousand Feet, Hastings Center Report (2010)
- Well, What About the Children? Best Interests Reasoning, the New Eugenics, and the Regulation of Reproduction, Gruter Institute Squal Valley Conference (2010)
- The Constitution and the Rights not to Procreate, Stanford Law Review (2008)
- The Right Not to Be a Genetic Parent?, Southern California Law Review (2008)
- Intentional Diminishment, the Non-Identity Problem, and Legal Liability, Hastings Law Journal (2008)
- Negotiating Death: ADR and End of Life Decision-making, Harvard Negotiation Law Review (2004)
- Note, The Price of Everything, the Value of Nothing: Reframing the Commodification Debate, Harvard Law Review (2003)
- Therapeutic Orphans, Pediatric Victims? The Best Pharmaceuticals for Children Act and Existing Pediatric Human Subject Protection, Food & Drug Law Journal (2003)
- Gore, Gibson, and Goldsmith: The Evolution of Internet Metaphors in Law and Commentary, Harvard Journal of Law & Technology (2002) (Co-authored with Jonathan Blavin)
- Recent Case, Supreme Court of New Jersey Holds that Preembryo Disposition Agreements are Not Binding When One Party Later Objects - J.B. V. M.B., Harvard Law Review (2001)
