= List of law schools attended by United States Supreme Court justices =

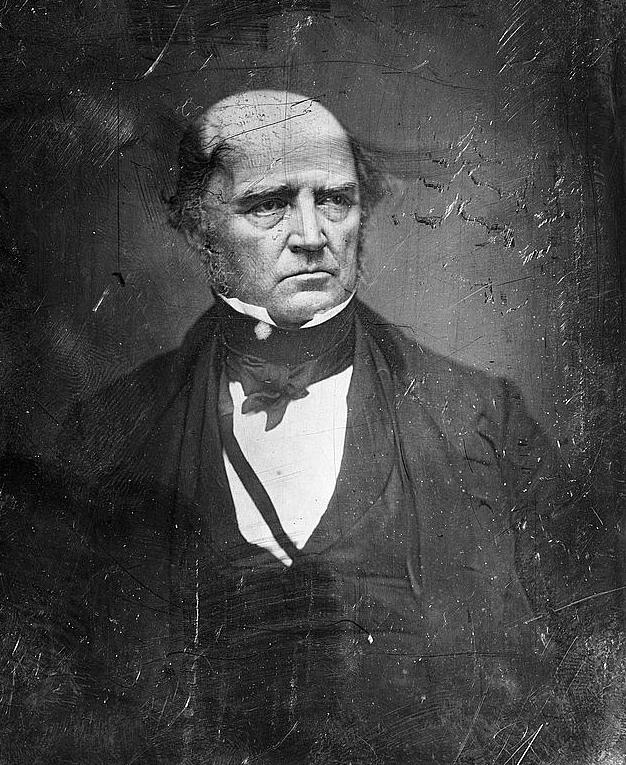
Levi Woodbury was the first Justice to have formally attended a law school.

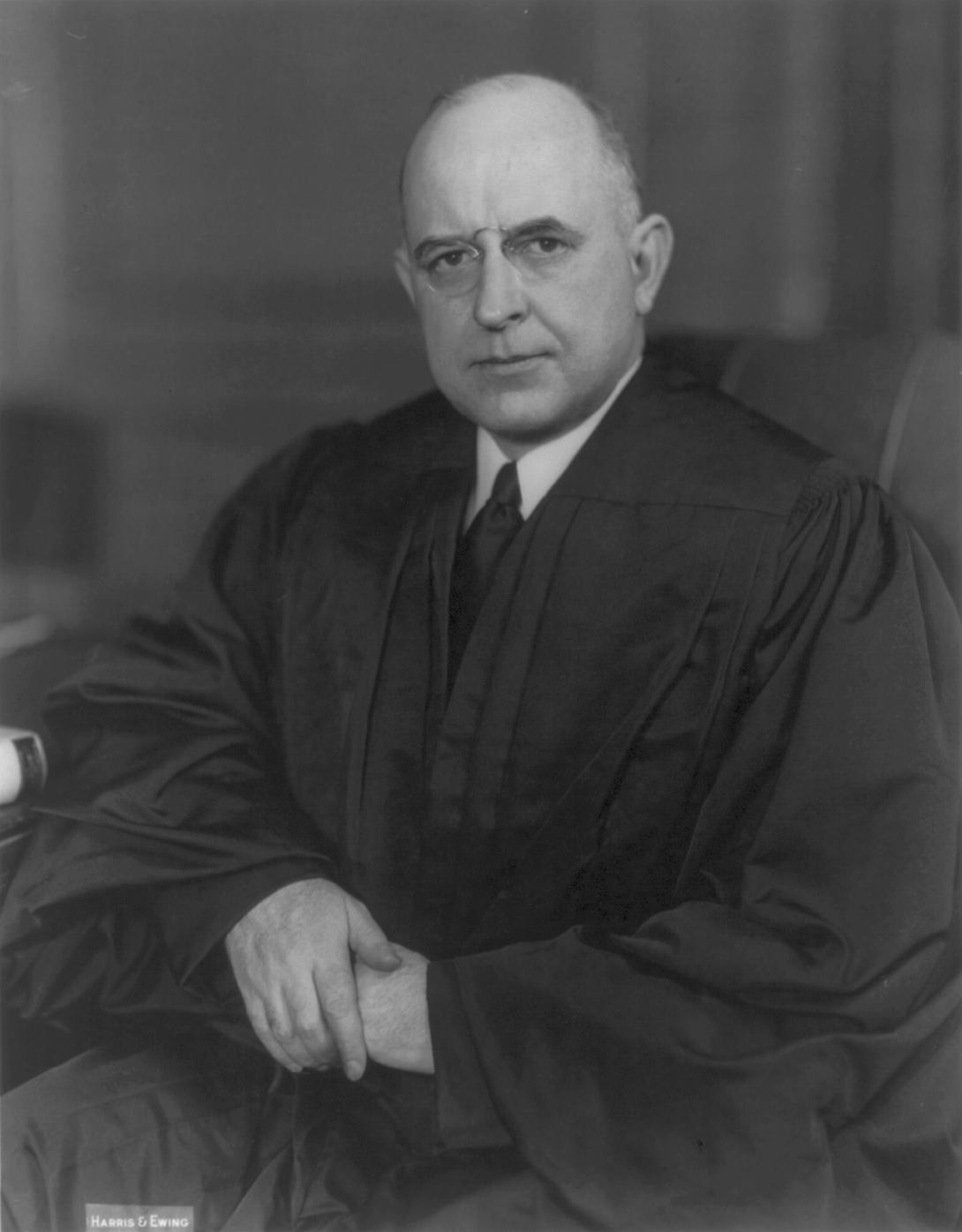
Stanley Forman Reed was the last sitting Justice not to have received a law degree.

The Constitution of the United States does not require that any federal judges have any particular educational or career background, but the work of the Court involves complex questions of law – ranging from constitutional law to administrative law to admiralty law – and consequentially, a legal education has become a de facto prerequisite to appointment on the United States Supreme Court. Every person who has been nominated to the Court has been an attorney.

Before the advent of modern law schools in the United States, justices, like most attorneys of the time, completed their legal studies by "reading law" (studying under and acting as an apprentice to more experienced attorneys) rather than attending a formal program. The first Justice to be appointed who had attended an actual law school was Levi Woodbury, appointed to the Court in 1846. Woodbury had attended Tapping Reeve Law School in Litchfield, Connecticut, the most prestigious law school in the United States in that day, prior to his admission to the bar in 1812. However, Woodbury did not earn a law degree. Woodbury's successor on the Court, Benjamin Robbins Curtis, who received his law degree from Harvard Law School in 1832, and was appointed to the Court in 1851, was the first Justice to bear such a credential.

Associate Justice James F. Byrnes, whose short tenure lasted from June 1941 to October 1942, was the last Justice without a law degree to be appointed; Stanley Forman Reed, who served on the Court from 1938 to 1957, was the last sitting Justice from such a background. In total, of the 114 justices appointed to the Court, 49 have had law degrees, an additional 18 attended some law school but did not receive a degree, and 47 received their legal education without any law school attendance.

Currently serving justices are listed in bold below.

== Four or more justices ==
- Harvard Law School – 22 alumni; 18 graduates
  1. Harry Blackmun
  2. Louis Brandeis
  3. William J. Brennan Jr.
  4. Stephen Breyer
  5. Henry Billings Brown – also studied law at Yale, did not receive law degree from either
  6. Harold H. Burton
  7. Benjamin Robbins Curtis
  8. Felix Frankfurter
  9. Melville Fuller – did not graduate; Chief Justice
  10. Ruth Bader Ginsburg – graduated from Columbia Law School
  11. **Neil Gorsuch**
  12. Horace Gray
  13. Oliver Wendell Holmes Jr.
  14. **Ketanji Brown Jackson**
  15. **Elena Kagan**
  16. Anthony Kennedy
  17. William Henry Moody – did not graduate
  18. Lewis F. Powell Jr. – LL.M. graduate
  19. **John Roberts** – Chief Justice
  20. Edward Terry Sanford
  21. Antonin Scalia
  22. David Souter
- Yale Law School – 11 alumni, 9 graduates
  1. **Samuel Alito**
  2. Henry Billings Brown – also studied law at Harvard, did not receive law degree from either
  3. David Davis
  4. Abe Fortas
  5. **Brett Kavanaugh**
  6. Sherman Minton – LL.M. graduate, attended Indiana University
  7. George Shiras Jr. – did not graduate
  8. **Sonia Sotomayor**
  9. Potter Stewart
  10. **Clarence Thomas**
  11. Byron White
- Columbia Law School – 7 alumni, 4 graduates
  1. Benjamin N. Cardozo – completed two years, did not graduate
  2. William O. Douglas
  3. Ruth Bader Ginsburg – also attended Harvard Law School
  4. Charles Evans Hughes – Chief Justice
  5. Joseph McKenna – studied at the law school, did not graduate
  6. Stanley Forman Reed – also attended University of Virginia School of Law, did not graduate from either
  7. Harlan F. Stone – Chief Justice

== Three justices ==
- University of Michigan Law School
  1. William Rufus Day – did not graduate
  2. Frank Murphy
  3. George Sutherland
- Litchfield Law School (defunct)
  1. Henry Baldwin
  2. Ward Hunt
  3. Levi Woodbury – first justice to have attended law school

== Two justices ==
- Albany Law School
  1. David J. Brewer
  2. Robert H. Jackson – completed one-year program, awarded certificate of completion
- Cincinnati Law School (University of Cincinnati College of Law)
  1. William Howard Taft – Chief Justice (and former President)
  2. Willis Van Devanter
- Cumberland School of Law
  1. Howell E. Jackson
  2. Horace Harmon Lurton
- Indiana University Maurer School of Law
  1. Sherman Minton
  2. Wiley Rutledge – studied part-time before leaving and completing degree at University of Colorado Law School
- Northwestern University School of Law
  1. Arthur Goldberg
  2. John Paul Stevens
- Stanford Law School
  1. Sandra Day O'Connor
  2. William Rehnquist – Chief Justice
- University of Virginia School of Law
  1. James Clark McReynolds
  2. Stanley Forman Reed – also attended Columbia Law School, did not graduate from either
- Washington and Lee University School of Law
  1. Joseph Rucker Lamar
  2. Lewis F. Powell Jr. – also received an LL.M. from Harvard Law School

== One justice ==
- Centre College School of Law (defunct)
  - Fred M. Vinson – Chief Justice
- Howard University School of Law
  - Thurgood Marshall
- Middle Temple – one of the four Inns of Court in London, England
  - John Rutledge
- Mitchell Hamline School of Law then known as St. Paul College of Law
  - Warren E. Burger – Chief Justice
- New York Law School
  - John Marshall Harlan II
- Notre Dame Law School
  - **Amy Coney Barrett**
- Transylvania University School of Law
  - John Marshall Harlan
- Tulane University School of Law
  - Edward White – Chief Justice
- University of Alabama School of Law
  - Hugo Black
- University of California, Berkeley School of Law
  - Earl Warren – Chief Justice
- University of Colorado Law School
  - Wiley Rutledge – originally studied at Indiana University prior to attending the University of Colorado
- University of Missouri–Kansas City School of Law
  - Charles Evans Whittaker
- University of Pennsylvania Law School
  - Owen Roberts
- University of Texas School of Law
  - Tom C. Clark

== University or college educated ==
These justices were educated at the equivalent of an undergraduate level, but did not receive legal education at the graduate level, the model under which law schools in the United States are currently organized.

- Carleton College
  - Pierce Butler
- Case Western Reserve University
  - John Hessin Clarke
- College of William & Mary
  - John Marshall – Chief Justice
  - Philip P. Barbour
  - Bushrod Washington
  - John Blair Jr.
- Columbia University
  - John Jay – Chief Justice
  - Samuel Blatchford
- Dartmouth College
  - Salmon P. Chase – Chief Justice
- Dickinson College
  - Robert Cooper Grier
  - Roger B. Taney – Chief Justice
- Emory University
  - Lucius Quintus Cincinnatus Lamar
- Harvard University
  - William Cushing
  - John McLean
  - Joseph Story
- Kenyon College
  - Stanley Matthews
- Middlebury College
  - Samuel Nelson
- Princeton University
  - Oliver Ellsworth – Chief Justice
  - William Johnson
  - Henry Brockholst Livingston
  - William Paterson
  - Mahlon Pitney
  - Smith Thompson
  - James M. Wayne
- Rutgers University
  - Joseph P. Bradley
- Saint Joseph's University
  - Joseph McKenna – also studied at Columbia Law School for a month between nomination to the Court and confirmation
- Transylvania University
  - Samuel Freeman Miller - earned a medical degree
  - Robert Trimble
- University of Georgia
  - John Archibald Campbell
- University of St Andrews
  - James Wilson – also attended the University of Edinburgh and University of Glasgow but did not graduate
- Washington and Lee University
  - Thomas Todd
- Williams College
  - Stephen Johnson Field
- Yale University
  - William Strong
  - Morrison Waite—Chief Justice
  - William Burnham Woods

== No university education ==
Some justices received no education in a university setting, but were instead either trained through apprenticeships or were self-taught, as was common with many lawyers prior to the mid-20th century. This practice is often known as reading the law.

- James F. Byrnes
- John Catron
- Samuel Chase
- Nathan Clifford
- Peter V. Daniel
- Gabriel Duvall
- James Iredell
- Thomas Johnson
- John McKinley
- Alfred Moore
- Rufus W. Peckham
- Noah Haynes Swayne

== See also ==
- List of law schools in the United States
