= Ruth Okediji =

American legal scholar

Ruth Lade Okediji
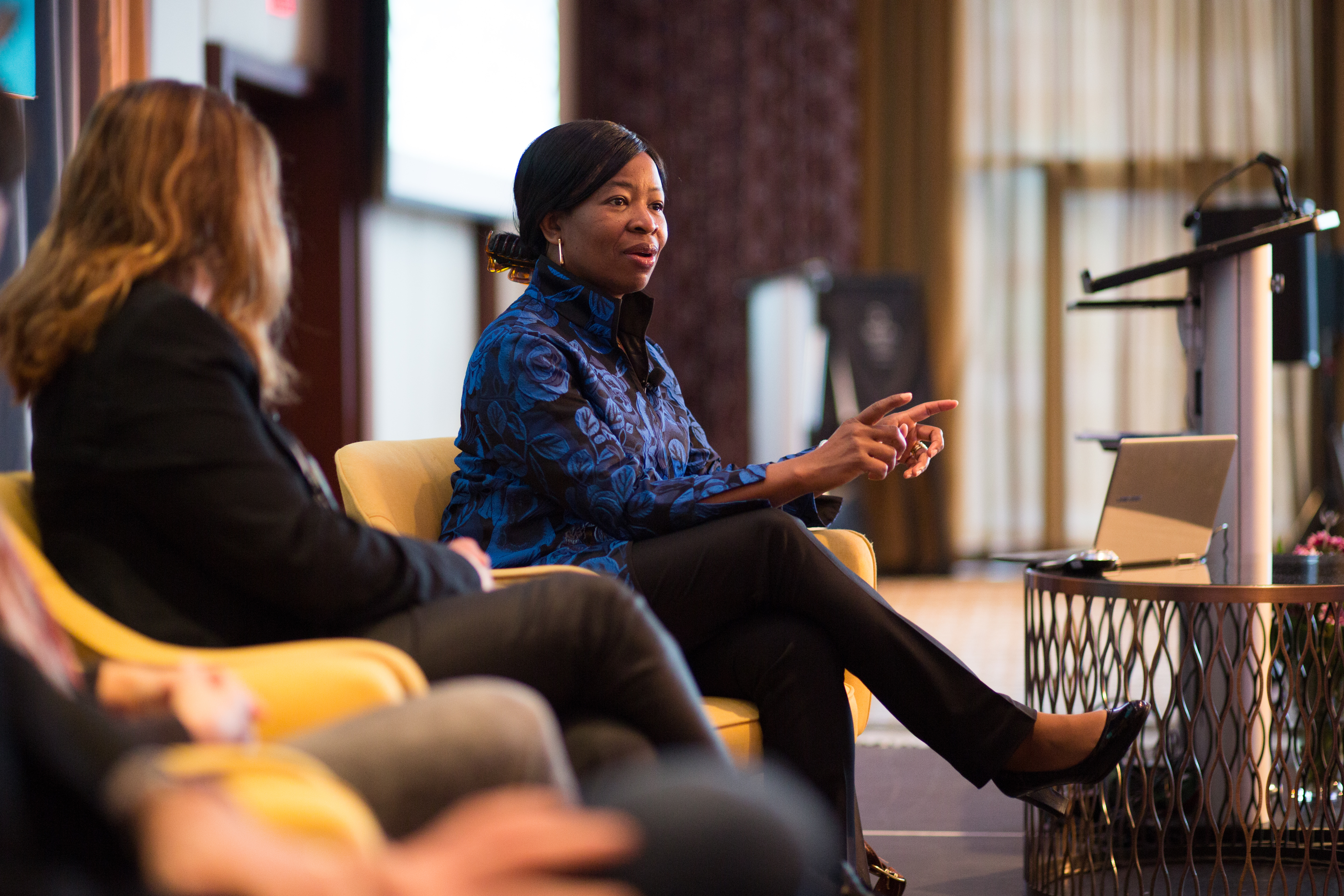
- Delivering a keynote at the Creative Commons Global Summit, 2018.
- Born: 1969 (age 56–57); Nigeria
- Education: University of Jos (LLB); Harvard University (LLM, SJD)
- Occupations: Author; lawyer; law professor

Ruth Lade Okediji (born 1969) is an American legal scholar. She is the Jeremiah Smith, Jr., Professor of Law at Harvard Law School and co-director of the Berkman Klein Center. She also founded and serves as faculty director of Harvard Law School's Program on Biblical Law and Christian Legal Studies. Professor Okediji is an internationally renowned expert and scholar on intellectual property, trade and development. In 2017 she was appointed as part of the Creative Commons Board.

== Education ==
She received an LL.B. from the University of Jos in Nigeria in 1989. She received her LL.M. in 1991 and S.J.D. in 1996, both from Harvard Law School.

== Career ==
She was the Edith Gaylord Presidential Professor of Law at the University of Oklahoma College of Law while also serving on the Oklahoma Public Employee Relations Board.

From 2003 to 2017, she taught at the University of Minnesota Law School where she was the William L. Prosser Professor of Law and appointed as a McKnight Presidential Professor.

In 2017, Okediji joined the Harvard Law faculty as a tenured professor.

She also held visiting professorships at Duke University School of Law, the University of Haifa Law School, the University of St. Thomas School of Law, and the University of Tilburg Law School.

She was awarded the prestigious Barry Prize for Distinguished Intellectual Achievement by the American Academy of Sciences and Letters in 2023.

== Bibliography ==
- Bagley, Margo A.; Okediji, Ruth L.; Erstling, Jay A. (2013). International Patent Law and Policy - American Casebook Series. St. Paul, MN. ISBN 978-0-314-28787-8. OCLC 842883961.
- Okediji, Ruth L.; Bagley, Margo A. (2014). Patent Law in Global Perspective. New York. ISBN 978-0-19-936110-6. OCLC 881476206.
- Cimoli, Mario; Dosi, Giovanni; Maskus, Keith E.; Okediji, Ruth L.; Reichman, Jerome H. (2014). Stiglitz, Joseph E. (ed.). Intellectual Property Rights : Legal and Economic Challenges for Development (First ed.). Oxford: Oxford. ISBN 978-0-19-966075-9. OCLC 879770440.
- Copyright Law in an Age of Limitations and Exceptions. New York, NY. 2017. ISBN 978-1-107-13237-5. OCLC 927166124.
- Helfer, Laurence R; Land, Molly K; Okediji, Ruth L; Reichman, J. H; Oxford University Press (2017). The World Blind Union guide to the Marrakesh Treaty: facilitating access to books for print-disabled individuals. New York: Oxford University Press. ISBN 978-0-19-067964-4. OCLC 1117298020.

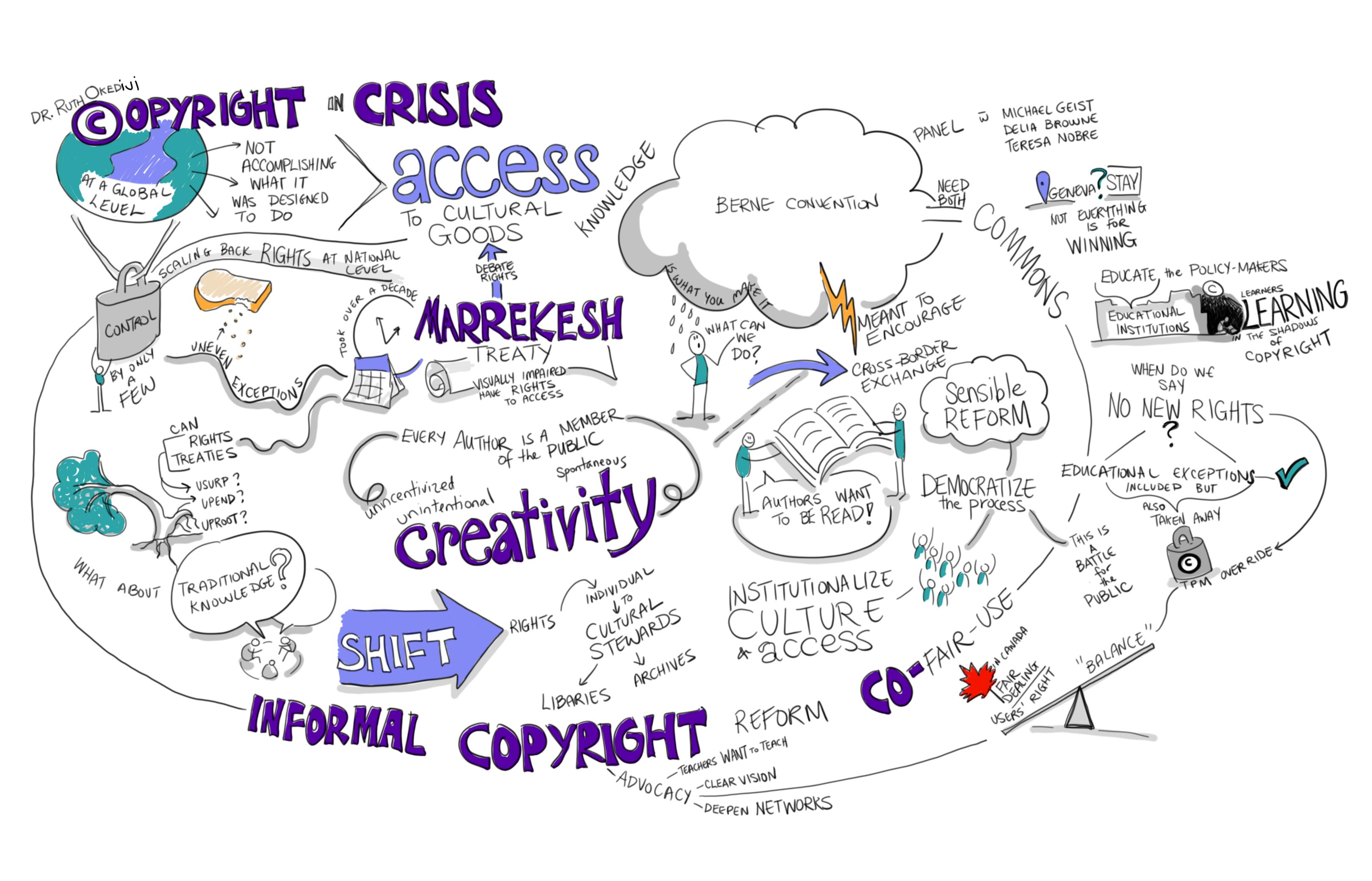
Live drawing of her keynote at the Creative Commons Global Summit, 2018.
