= Jeannie Suk =

American law professor (born 1973)

Jeannie Suk Gersen
- Born: Jeannie Suk; 1973 (age 52–53); Seoul, South Korea
- Education: Yale University (BA); St Hugh's College, Oxford (DPhil); Harvard University (JD)
- Occupations: Law professor; author
- Employer: Harvard Law School
- Spouses: Noah R. Feldman (m. 1999; div. 2011): Jacob Gersen

Jeannie Suk Gersen (born 1973) is an American legal scholar at Harvard Law School. She became the first Asian American woman awarded tenure at Harvard Law School in 2010.

== Biography ==
Suk attended Hunter College High School, graduating in 1991. In 1995, Suk received her B.A. in literature from Yale University, and a D.Phil. at St Hugh's College, Oxford, in 1999, as a Marshall Scholar. In 2002, she graduated with a J.D. degree from Harvard Law School. After law school, she clerked for Judge Harry T. Edwards of the U.S. Court of Appeals for the District of Columbia Circuit, and Justice David Souter of the U.S. Supreme Court during the 2003 term.

In 2006, Suk became an assistant professor at Harvard Law School, making her the second woman of minority background to join the faculty (after Lani Guinier). In 2010, Suk was granted tenure; she was the first Asian American woman awarded tenure in the law school's history. She is currently the John H. Watson, Jr. Professor of Law.

== Awards ==
She was named one of the "Best Lawyers Under 40" by the National Asian Pacific American Bar Association and a "Top Woman of the Law" by Massachusetts Lawyers Weekly. She was awarded the prestigious Barry Prize for Distinguished Intellectual Achievement by the American Academy of Sciences and Letters in 2024.

== Bibliography ==
Her writing focuses on criminal law and family law. In 2016, she co-wrote an article with her husband on modern regulation of sex that argued most practices are counter-productive. She has also published on intellectual property protection for fashion design. Suk is a contributing writer for New Yorker magazine.

=== Books ===
- Postcolonial Paradoxes in French Caribbean Writing: Césaire, Glissant, Condé, Oxford University Press, 2001. ISBN 978-0198160182.
- At Home in the Law: How the Domestic Violence Revolution Is Transforming Privacy, Yale University Press, 2009. ISBN 978-0300113983.
- A Light Inside: An Odyssey of Art, Life and Law, Kong & Park, 2013. ISBN 978-8956056326

=== Essays and reporting ===
- Gersen, Jeannie Suk (April 25 – May 2, 2022). "Beyond Roe". The Talk of the Town: Comment. The New Yorker. 98 (10): 13–14. Retitled online as "If Roe v. Wade is overturned, what's next?".

== Personal life ==
In 1999, Suk married Harvard Law School Professor Noah Feldman with whom she has two children. Her second marriage is to Sidley Austin Professor of Law at Harvard Law School, Jacob E. Gersen.

== See also ==
- List of law clerks for the third seat of the Supreme Court of the United States
