= Roderick Bremby =

American politician

Roderick Bremby was the longest serving Secretary of the Kansas Department of Health and Environment. Bremby was appointed by former Governor Kathleen Sebelius in January 2003 and served until January 2011.

Before that, was assistant city manager in Lawrence, Kansas from August 1990 until March 2000.
