= Mark J. Roe =

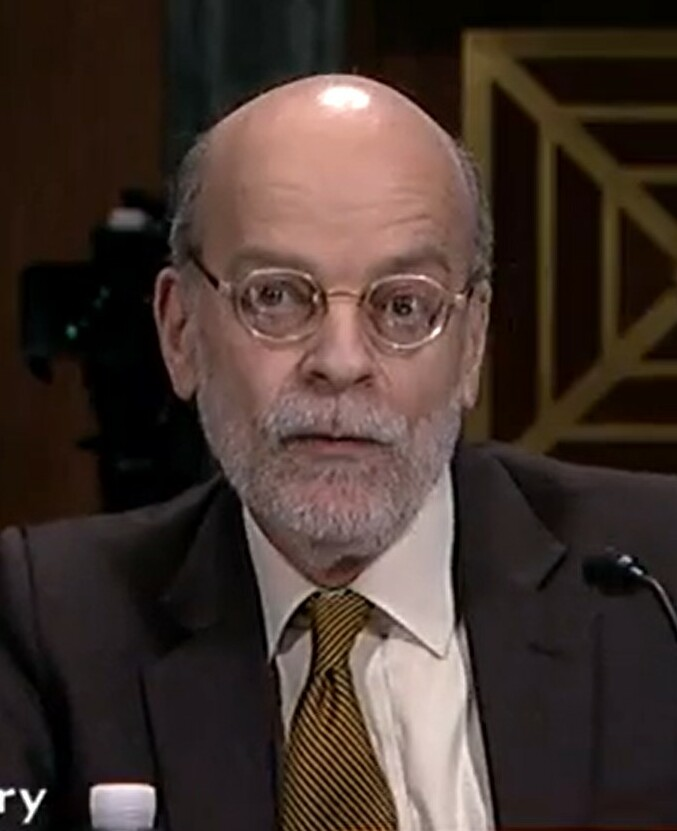
- Roe in 2018
- Education: Columbia University; Harvard Law School

Mark J. Roe is the David Berg Professor of Law at Harvard Law School, appointed in 2001.

Roe is the author of Strong Managers, Weak Owners (Princeton, 1994) and Political Determinants of Corporate Governance (Oxford, 2003), in which he shows underlying connections between business structures and national political configurations. He explores the political economy of American corporate lawmaking in a series of articles, two of which are published in the Harvard Law Review and Stanford Law Review. He also comments on business and finance legal issues in such publications as the Financial Times, Forbes, and The Wall Street Journal. He has opinion pieces in these journals on the General Motors bankruptcy, derivatives debilities in the 2008 financial crisis, and shortcomings of the 2010 financial reform.

He received his B.A. from Columbia University in 1972, and his J.D. from Harvard Law School in 1975. Prior to joining the Harvard faculty, he held positions at Columbia Law School and the University of Pennsylvania School of Law. He is a member of the American Academy of Arts and Sciences and a regular contributor to Project Syndicate since 2004. ..
