= Richard Lazarus (law professor) =

American legal scholar

Richard J. Lazarus is an American legal scholar who is the Charles Stebbins Fairchild Professor of Law at Harvard Law School.

== Early life and education ==
Lazarus graduated from University High School in Urbana, Illinois. He holds a B.S. in chemistry and a B.A. in economics from the University of Illinois (1976) and a J.D. from Harvard Law School (1979). Prior to his arrival at Georgetown in 1996, Lazarus taught at the Law School at Washington University in St. Louis (1989–1996) and the Indiana University Maurer School of Law (1983–1985) and worked in the Solicitor General's Office (1986–1989) and the Land and Natural Resources Division of the United States Department of Justice (1979–1983).

== Career ==
Lazarus was the Justice William J. Brennan, Jr. Professor of Law at the Georgetown University Law Center, where he focused his teaching and scholarship on environmental law, natural resources law, constitutional law, Supreme Court Advocacy, torts, property, and administrative law. He was Faculty Director of the Supreme Court Institute, which provides moot court sessions for counsel in more than 90 percent of Supreme Court cases. He was also the Stanley Legro Professor of Environmental Law at the University of San Diego, School of Law. He was appointed Executive Director of the National Commission on the BP Deepwater Horizon Oil Spill and Offshore Drilling in June 2010. Since 2011, he has been the Charles Stebbins Fairchild Professor of Law at Harvard Law School.

In November 2020, Lazarus was named a volunteer member of the Joe Biden presidential transition Agency Review Team to support transition efforts related to the United States Department of Justice.

== Selected works ==
- Lazarus, Richard; Houck, Oliver (2005). Environmental Law Stories. New York: Foundation Press. ISBN 978-1-58778-728-7.
- Lazarus, Richard (2004). The Making of Environmental Law. Chicago: University of Chicago Press. ISBN 978-0-226-47037-5.
- Lazarus, Richard (2021). The Rule of Five: Making Climate History at the Supreme Court. Cambridge, MA: Belknap Press. ISBN 978-0674260436.
- Lazarus, Richard J. (2023). The making of environmental law (Second ed.). Chicago London: The University of Chicago Press. ISBN 978-0-226-69545-7.
