= Harvard Law School =

Law school of Harvard University in Cambridge, Massachusetts

- Motto: Veritas, Lex et Iustitia (Latin for 'Truth, Law and Justice')
- Parent school: Harvard University
- Established: 1817; 209 years ago
- School type: Private law school
- Dean: John C. P. Goldberg
- Location: Cambridge, Massachusetts, US
- Enrollment: 1,990 (2025)
- Faculty: 359
- USNWR ranking: 6th (tie) (2025)
- Bar pass rate: 99.4% (2021)
- Website: hls.harvard.edu
- ABA profile: Standard 509 Report

Harvard Law School (HLS) is the law school of Harvard University, a private Ivy League research university in Cambridge, Massachusetts. Founded in 1817, it is the oldest law school in continuous operation in the United States.

Each class in the three-year JD program has approximately 560 students. The first-year class is broken into seven sections of approximately 80 students, who take most first-year classes together. Aside from the JD program, Harvard also awards both LLM and SJD degrees.

HLS has the world's largest academic law library. The school has an estimated 359 faculty members. According to Harvard Law's 2020 ABA-required disclosures, 99% of 2019 graduates passed the bar exam. The school's graduates accounted for more than one-quarter of all Supreme Court clerks between 2000 and 2010, more than any other law school in the United States.

Harvard Law School has produced a large and influential global network of distinguished alumni, including U.S. presidents, foreign heads of state, foreign chief justices, as well as many business and law firm leaders. No other law school has graduated more U.S. Supreme Court justices, U.S. Attorneys General, and U.S. Solicitors General than Harvard Law School. A 2025 study also found that HLS graduated more members of Congress than any other law school, and a 2017 study found that HLS also graduated more sitting federal judges, U.S. Attorneys, state attorneys general, and state solicitors general than any other law school.

== History ==
=== Founding ===
Harvard Law School's founding is traced to the establishment of a "law department" at Harvard in 1819. Dating the founding to the year of the creation of the law department makes Harvard Law School the oldest continuously operating law school in the United States. William & Mary Law School opened first in 1779, but it closed during the American Civil War and did not reopen until 1920. The University of Maryland School of Law was chartered in 1816 but did not begin classes until 1824, and it also closed during the Civil War.

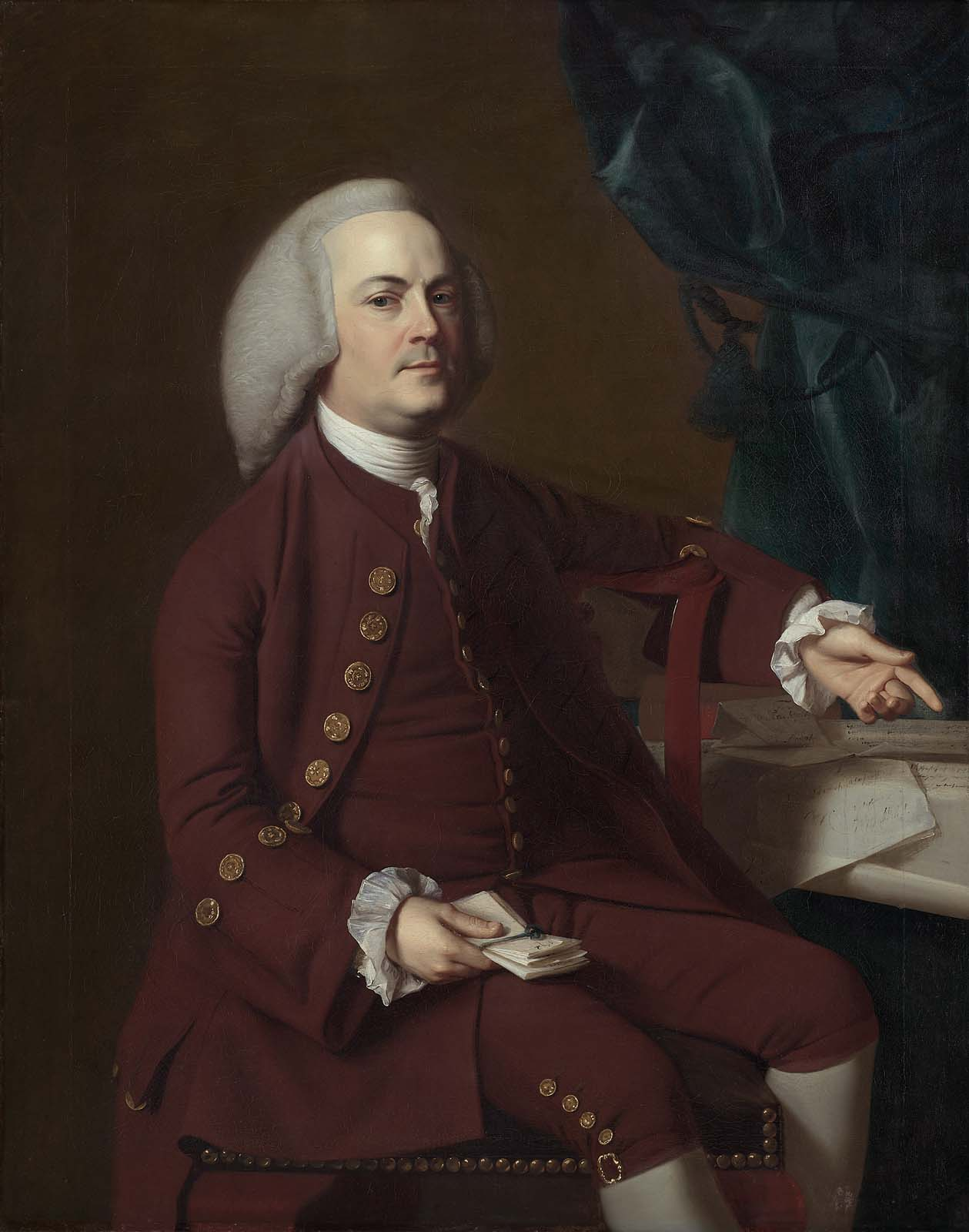
Portrait of Isaac Royall Jr., painted in 1769 by J.S. Copley

The founding of the law department came two years after the establishment of Harvard's first endowed professorship in law, funded by a bequest from the estate of merchant and slave-trader Isaac Royall Jr., in 1817. Royall had fled to Nova Scotia as a Loyalist during the American Revolution. When Royall died in exile in 1781, he left roughly 1,000 acres of land in Massachusetts to Harvard, "to be appropriated towards the endowing a Professor of Laws ... or a Professor of Physick and Anatomy, whichever the said overseers and Corporation [of the college] shall judge to be best." The value of the land, when fully liquidated in 1809, was $2,938 (equivalent to $60,500 in 2025); the Harvard Corporation allocated $400 from the income generated by those funds to create the Royall Professorship of Law in 1815. The Royalls were so involved in the slave trade, that "the labor of slaves underwrote the teaching of law in Cambridge." The dean of the law school traditionally held the Royall chair; deans Elena Kagan and Martha Minow declined the Royall chair due to its origins in the proceeds of slavery.

The Royall family's coat of arms, which shows three stacked wheat sheaves on a blue background, was adopted as part of the law school's arms in 1936, topped with the university's motto (Veritas, Latin for 'truth'). Until the school began investigating its connections with slavery in the 2010s, most alumni and faculty at the time were unaware of the origins of the arms. In March 2016, following requests by students, the school decided to remove the emblem because of its association with slavery. In November 2019, Harvard announced that a working group had been tasked to develop a new emblem. In August 2021, the new Harvard Law School emblem was introduced.

In 2019, the government of Antigua and Barbuda requested reparations from Harvard Law School on the grounds that it benefitted from Royall's enslavement of people in the country.

=== Growth ===
By 1827, the school, with one faculty member, was struggling. Nathan Dane, a prominent alumnus of the college, then endowed the Dane Professorship of Law, insisting that it be given to then Supreme Court justice Joseph Story. For a while, the school was called "Dane Law School". In 1829, John H. Ashmun, son of Eli Porter Ashmun and brother of George Ashmun, accepted a professorship and closed his Northampton Law School, with many of his students following him to Harvard. Story's belief in the need for an elite law school based on merit and dedicated to public service helped build the school's reputation at the time, although the contours of these beliefs have not been consistent throughout its history. Enrollment remained low through the 19th century as university legal education was considered to be of little added benefit to apprenticeships in legal practice. After first trying lowered admissions standards, in 1848 HLS eliminated admissions requirements. In 1869, HLS also eliminated examination requirements.

In the 1870s, under Dean Christopher Columbus Langdell, HLS introduced what has become the standard first-year curriculum for American law schools – including classes in contracts, property, torts, criminal law, and civil procedure. At Harvard, Langdell also developed the case method of teaching law, now the dominant pedagogical model at U.S. law schools. Langdell's notion that law could be studied as a "science" gave university legal education a reason for being distinct from vocational preparation. Critics at first defended the old lecture method because it was faster and cheaper and made fewer demands on faculty and students. Advocates said the case method had a sounder theoretical basis in scientific research and the inductive method. Langdell's graduates became leading professors at other law schools where they introduced the case method. The method was facilitated by casebooks. From its founding in 1900, the Association of American Law Schools promoted the case method in law schools that sought accreditation.

=== 20th century ===
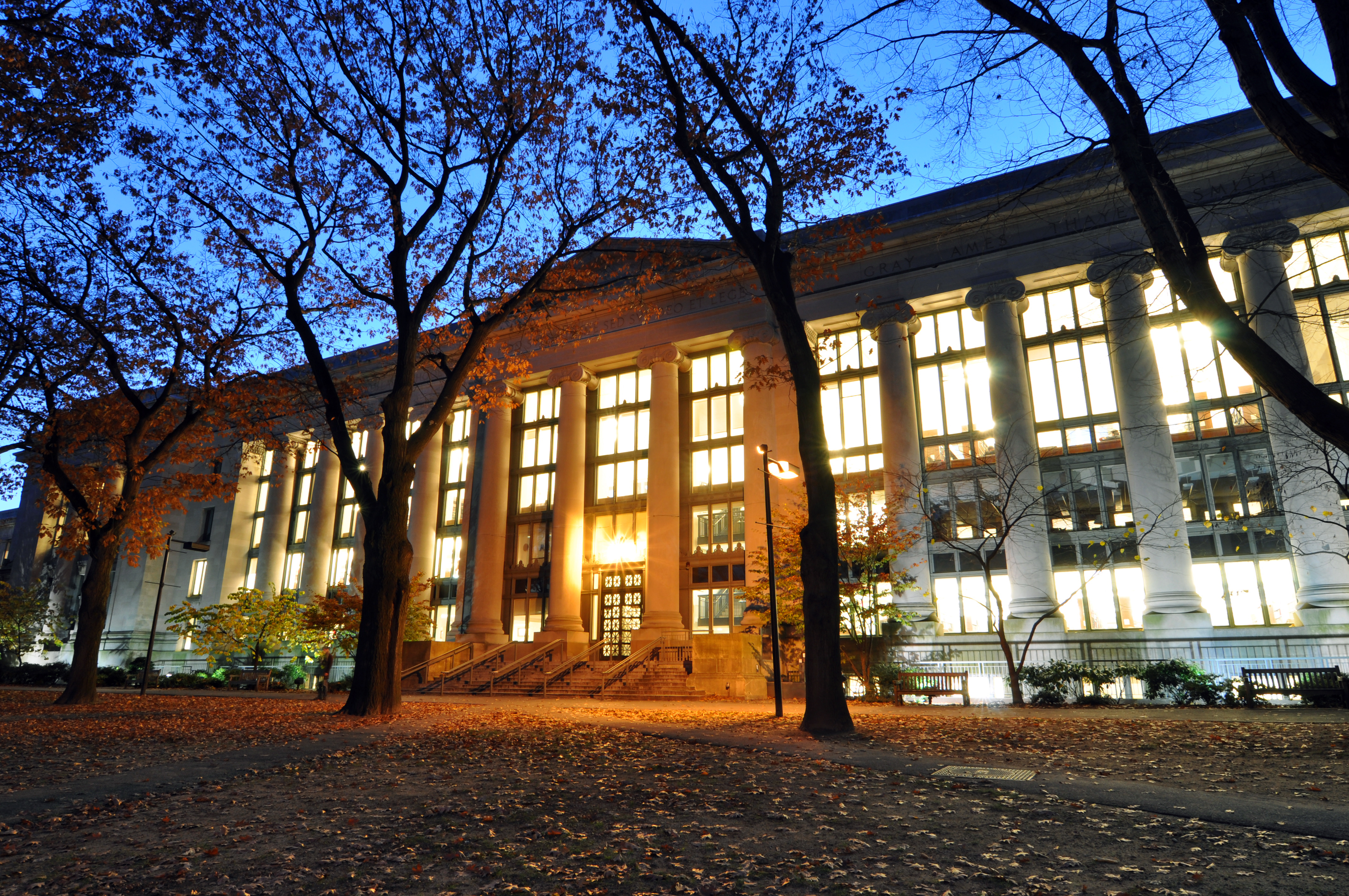
Langdell Hall

During the 20th century, Harvard Law School was known for its competitiveness. For example, Bob Berring called it "a samurai ring where you can test your swordsmanship against the swordsmanship of the strongest intellectual warriors from around the nation." When Langdell developed the original law school curriculum, Harvard President Charles Eliot told him to make it "hard and long". An urban legend holds that incoming students are told to "Look to your left, look to your right, because one of you won't be here by the end of the year." Scott Turow's memoir One L and John Jay Osborn's novel The Paper Chase describe such an environment. Trailing many of its peers, Harvard Law did not admit women as students until 1950, for the class of 1953.

Eleanor Kerlow's book Poisoned Ivy: How Egos, Ideology, and Power Politics Almost Ruined Harvard Law School criticized the school for a 1980s political dispute between newer and older faculty members over accusations of insensitivity to minority and feminist issues. Divisiveness over such issues as political correctness lent the school the title "Beirut on the Charles".

In Broken Contract: A Memoir of Harvard Law School, Richard Kahlenberg criticized the school for driving students away from public interest and toward work in high-paying law firms. Kahlenberg's criticisms are supported by Granfield and Koenig's study, which found that "students [are directed] toward service in the most prestigious law firms, both because they learn that such positions are their destiny and because the recruitment network that results from collective eminence makes these jobs extremely easy to obtain." The school has also been criticized for its large first year class sizes (at one point there were 140 students per classroom; in 2001 there were 80), a cold and aloof administration, and an inaccessible faculty. The latter stereotype is a central plot element of The Paper Chase and appears in Legally Blonde.

In response to the above criticisms, HLS eventually implemented the once-criticized but now dominant approach pioneered by Dean Robert Hutchins at Yale Law School, of shifting the competitiveness to the admissions process while making law school itself a more cooperative experience. Robert Granfield and Thomas Koenig's 1992 study of Harvard Law students that appeared in The Sociological Quarterly found that students "learn to cooperate with rather than compete against classmates," and that contrary to "less eminent" law schools, students "learn that professional success is available for all who attend, and that therefore, only neurotic 'gunners' try to outdo peers."

=== 21st century ===
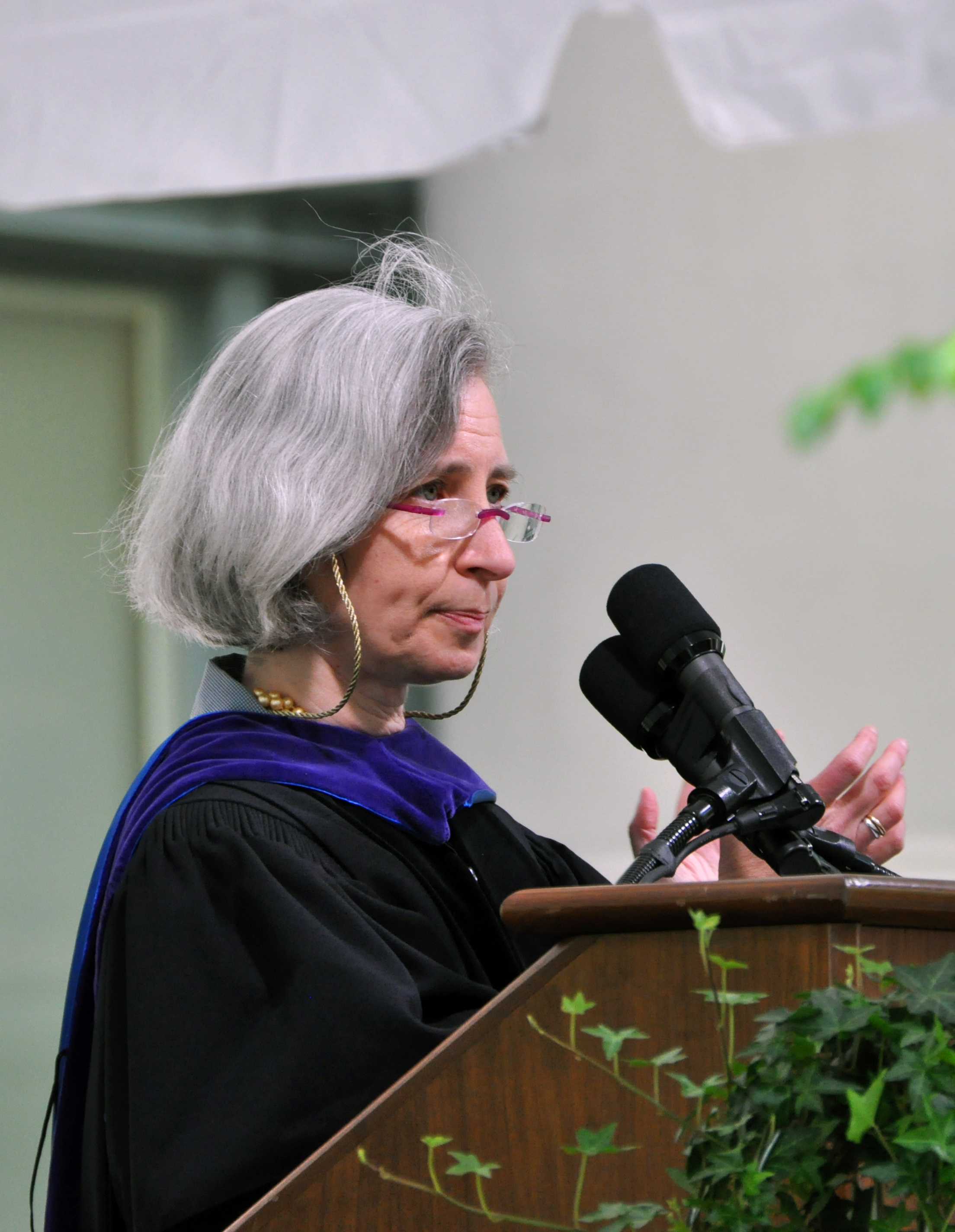
Martha Minow, dean, 2009–2017

Under Kagan, the second half of the 2000s saw significant academic changes since the implementation of the Langdell curriculum. In 2006, the faculty voted unanimously to approve a new first-year curriculum, placing greater emphasis on problem-solving, administrative law, and international law. The new curriculum was implemented in stages over the next several years, with the last new course, a first-year practice-oriented problem-solving workshop, being instituted in January 2010. In late 2008, the faculty decided that the school should move to an Honors/Pass/Low Pass/Fail (H/P/LP/F) grading system, much like those in place at Yale and at Stanford Law School. The system applied to half the courses taken by students in the Class of 2010 and fully started with the Class of 2011.

In 2009, Kagan was appointed solicitor general of the United States by President Barack Obama and resigned the deanship. On June 11, 2009, Harvard University president, Drew Gilpin Faust named Martha Minow as the new dean. She assumed the position on July 1, 2009. On January 3, 2017, Minow announced that she would conclude her tenure as dean at the end of the academic year. In June 2017, John F. Manning was named as the new dean, effective as of July 1, 2017.

In September 2017, the school unveiled a plaque acknowledging the indirect role played by slavery in its history:

In honor of the enslaved whose labor created wealth that made possible the founding of Harvard Law School May we pursue the highest ideals of law and justice in their memory.

In 2025, an original copy of the Magna Carta was found, kept in Harvard's library for nearly 80 years.

=== Coat of arms ===
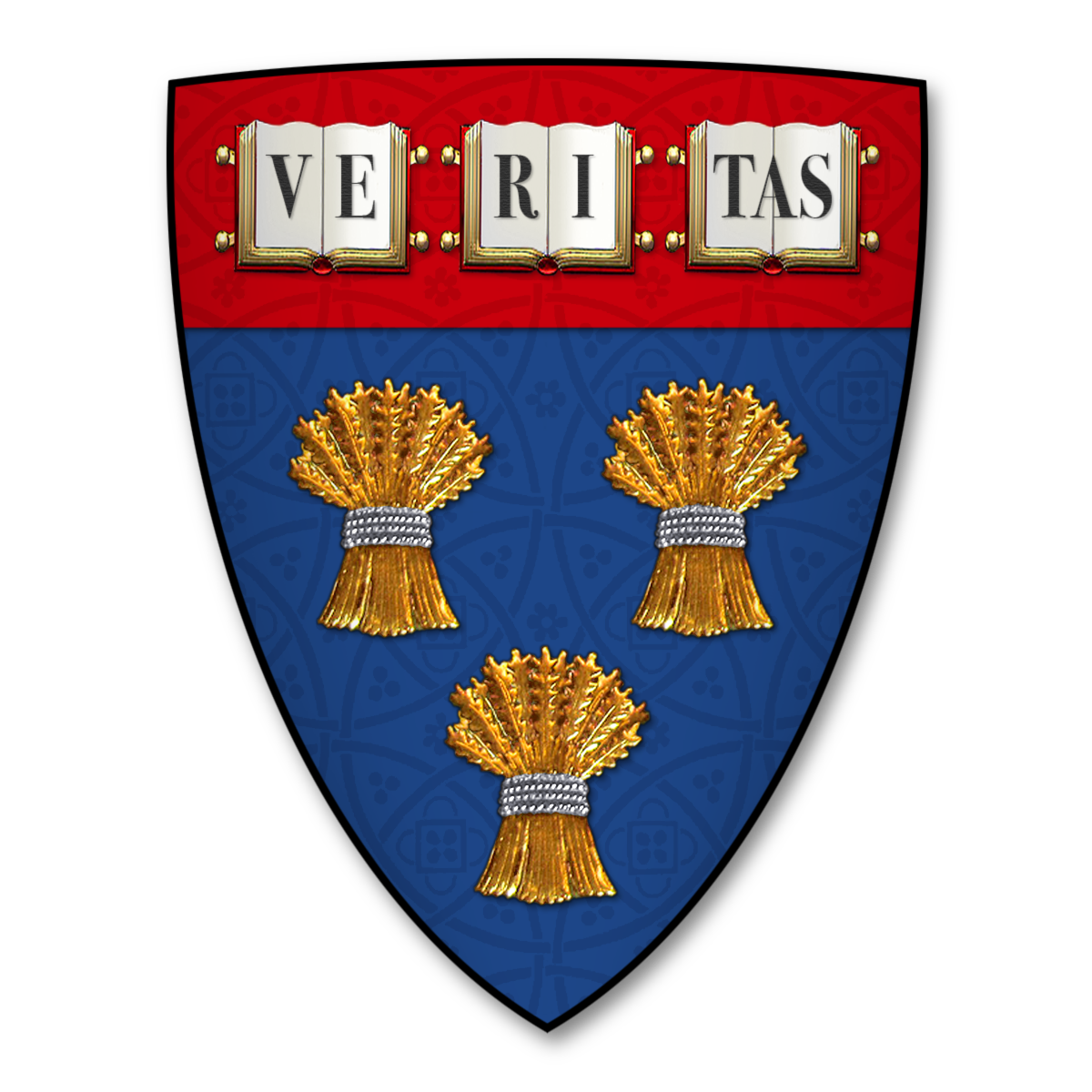
The coat of arms of Harvard Law School which was retired in 2016

The governing body of the university voted to retire the law school's coat of arms. The school's shield incorporated the three garbs of wheat from the armorial bearings of Isaac Royall Jr., a university benefactor who had endowed the first professorship in the law school. The shield had become a source of contention among a group of law school students, who objected to the Royall family's history of slave ownership.

The president of the university and dean of the law school, acting upon the recommendation of a committee formed to study the issue, ultimately agreed with its majority decision, that the shield was inconsistent with the values of both the university and the law school. Their recommendation was ultimately adopted by the Harvard Corporation and on March 15, 2016, the shield was ordered retired.

On August 23, 2021, it was announced that a new emblem was approved by the Harvard Corporation. The new design features Harvard's traditional motto, Veritas (Latin for 'truth'), resting above the Latin phrase Lex et Iustitia, meaning 'law and justice'. According to the HLS Shield Working Group's final report, the expanding or diverging lines, some with no obvious beginning or end, are meant to convey a sense of broad scope or great distance — the limitlessness of the school's work and mission. The radial lines also allude to the latitudinal and longitudinal lines that define the arc of the earth, conveying the global reach of the Law School's community and impact. The multifaceted, radiating form — a form inspired by architectural details found in both Austin Hall and Hauser Hall — seeks to convey dynamism, complexity, inclusiveness, connectivity, and strength.

== Student life ==
=== Student organizations ===
Harvard Law School has more than 90 student organizations that are active on campus. These organizations include the student-edited journals, Harvard Law Record, and the HLS Drama Society, which organizes the annual Harvard Law School Parody, the Harvard Legal Aid Bureau as well as other political, social, service, and athletic groups.

HLS Student Government is the primary governing, advocacy, and representative body for Law School students. In addition, students are represented at the university level by the Harvard Graduate Council.

==== Harvard Law Review ====
Students of the Juris Doctor (JD) program are involved in preparing and publishing the Harvard Law Review, one of the most highly cited university law reviews, as well as several other law journals and an independent student newspaper. The Harvard Law Review was first published in 1887 and has been staffed and edited by some of the school's most notable alumni.

In addition to the journal, the Harvard Law Review Association, in conjunction with the Columbia Law Review, University of Pennsylvania Law Review, and Yale Law Journal also publishes The Bluebook: A Uniform System of Citation, the most widely followed authority for legal citation formats in the United States.

The student newspaper, the Harvard Law Record, has been published continuously since the 1940s, making it one of the oldest law school newspapers in the country, and has included the exploits of fictional law student Fenno for decades.

The Harvard Law Bulletin is the magazine of record for Harvard Law School. The Harvard Law Bulletin was first published in April 1948. The magazine is currently published twice a year, but in previous years has been published four or six times a year. The magazine was first published online in fall 1997.

==== Student journals ====
- Harvard Law Review
- Harvard Business Law Review
- Harvard Civil Rights-Civil Liberties Law Review
- Harvard BlackLetter Law Journal
- Harvard Environmental Law Review
- Harvard Human Rights Journal
- Harvard International Law Journal
- Harvard Journal of Law & Gender (formerly Women's Law Journal)
- Harvard Journal of Law & Public Policy
- Harvard Journal of Law & Technology
- Harvard Journal of Sports and Entertainment Law
- Harvard Journal on Legislation
- Harvard Latin American Law Review
- Harvard Law & Policy Review
- Harvard National Security Journal
- Harvard Negotiation Law Review
- Unbound: Harvard Journal of the Legal Left

==== Forums ====
- Harvard Law School Forum, brings speakers to Harvard Law School to discuss issues
- Harvard Law Review Forum, is an online journal of scholarly responses to the Harvard Law Review's content

=== Costs ===
The cost of tuition for the 2022–2023 school year (9 month term) was $72,430. A mandatory student health fee was $1,304, bringing the total direct costs for the 2022–2023 school year to $73,734.

The total cost of attendance (indicating the cost of tuition, fees, and living expenses) at Harvard Law for the 2021–2022 academic year was $104,200.

=== Employment ===
According to the school's employment summary for 2020 graduates, 86.8% were employed in bar passage required jobs and another 5.3% were employed in J.D. advantage jobs.

ABA Employment Summary for 2020 Graduates
Employment Status	Percentage
Employed – Bar Passage Required	86.84%
Employed – J.D. Advantage	5.26%
Employed – Professional Position	1.75%
Employed – Non-Professional Position	0.0%
Employed – Undeterminable	0.0%
Pursuing Graduate Degree Full Time	0.0%
Unemployed – Start Date Deferred	0.0%
Unemployed – Not Seeking	1.23%
Unemployed – Seeking	1.23%
Employment Status Unknown	0.0%
Total of 570 Graduates

== Rankings ==
HLS was ranked tied for sixth best law school in the United States by U.S. News & World Report in its 2023 rankings. HLS was ranked first in the world by QS World University Rankings in 2023. It is ranked first in the world by the 2019 Academic Ranking of World Universities.

In November 2022, the law school made a joint decision along with Yale Law School to withdraw from the U.S. News & World Report Best Law Schools rankings, citing the system's "flawed methodology".

== Research programs and centers ==
- Animal Law & Policy Program
- Berkman Klein Center for Internet and Society
- Center on the Legal Profession (CLP)
- Charles Hamilton Houston Institute for Race and Justice
- Child Advocacy Program (CAP)
- Criminal Justice Policy Program (CJPP)
- East Asian Legal Studies Program (EALS)
- Environmental & Energy Law Program
- Foundations of Private Law
- Harvard Initiative on Law and Philosophy
- Harvard Law School Project on Disability (HPOD)
- Human Rights Program (HRP)
- Institute for Global Law and Policy (IGLP)
- John M. Olin Center for Law, Economics and Business
- The Julis-Rabinowitz Program on Jewish and Israeli Law
- Labor and Worklife Program (LWP)
- The Petrie-Flom Center for Health Law Policy, Biotechnology, and Bioethics
- Program in Islamic Law (PIL)
- Program on Biblical Law and Christian Legal Studies (PBLCLS)
- Program on Behavioral Economics and Public Policy
- Program on Corporate Governance
- Program on Institutional Investors (PII)
- Program on International Financial Systems (PIFS)
- Program on International Law and Armed Conflict (PILAC)
- Program on Law and Society in the Muslim World
- Program on Negotiation (PON)
- Shareholder Rights Project (SRP)
- Systemic Justice Project (SJP)
- Tax Law Program
- Harvard Law School Forum on Corporate Governance, co-sponsored by the Program on Corporate Governance, Program on Institutional Investors, and Program on Law and Finance, is one of the most widely read law websites in the country
- Harvard Human Rights Reflections, hosted by the Human Rights Program, is a widely read discussion platform for critical engagement with the human rights project featuring legal arguments, advocacy pieces, applied research, practitioner's notes and other forms of reflections related to human rights law, theory, and practice

== People ==
=== Alumni ===
President Barack Obama

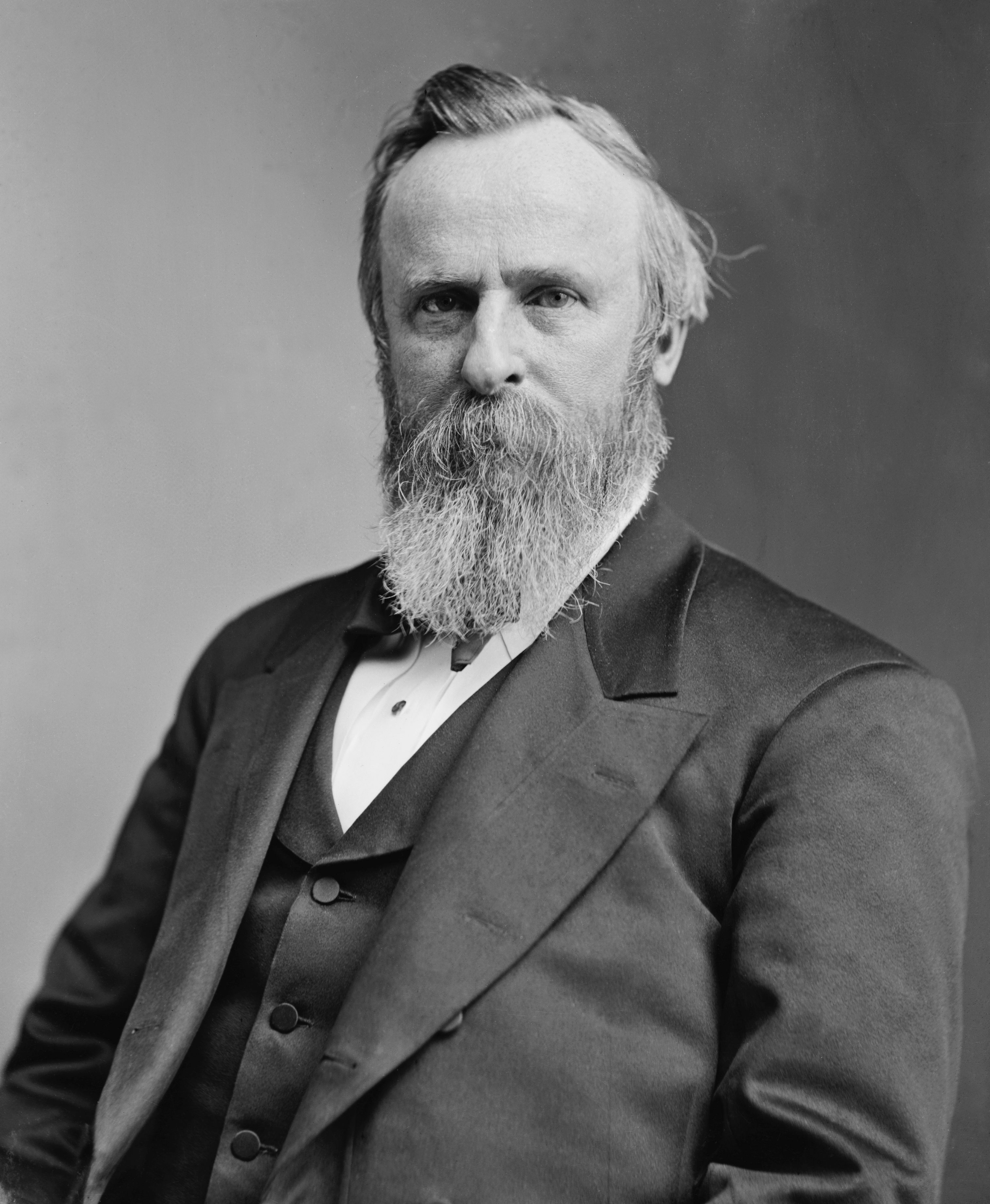
President Rutherford Hayes

Rutherford B. Hayes, the 19th president of the United States, graduated from HLS. Additionally, Barack Obama, the 44th president of the United States, graduated from HLS and was president of the Harvard Law Review. His wife, Michelle Obama, is also a graduate of Harvard Law School. Past presidential candidates who are HLS graduates include Michael Dukakis, Ralph Nader and Mitt Romney. The current Chair of the Federal Reserve, Kevin Warsh, is a graduate of Harvard Law. Eight sitting U.S. senators are alumni of HLS: Ted Cruz, Mike Crapo, Tim Kaine, Jack Reed, Chuck Schumer, Adam Schiff, Tom Cotton, and Mark Warner. Attorneys General Merrick Garland, Loretta Lynch, Alberto Gonzales, and Janet Reno, among many other Cabinet officials, graduated from HLS.

Twenty two alumni of Harvard Law School have served on the Supreme Court of the United States, more than any other law school. Four of the current nine members of the Court graduated from HLS: the Chief Justice, John Roberts; Associate Justices Neil Gorsuch; Ketanji Brown Jackson; and Elena Kagan, who also served as the Dean of Harvard Law School, from 2003 to 2009. Past Supreme Court Justices from Harvard Law School include Antonin Scalia, David Souter, Harry Blackmun, William J. Brennan, Louis Brandeis, Felix Frankfurter, Lewis Powell (LLM), and Oliver Wendell Holmes Jr., among others. Ruth Bader Ginsburg attended Harvard Law School for two years. HLS also produced three of the most influential American jurists and legal thinkers who never served on the Supreme Court: Learned Hand, Henry Friendly, and Richard Posner. Posner is the most-cited legal scholar in American history.

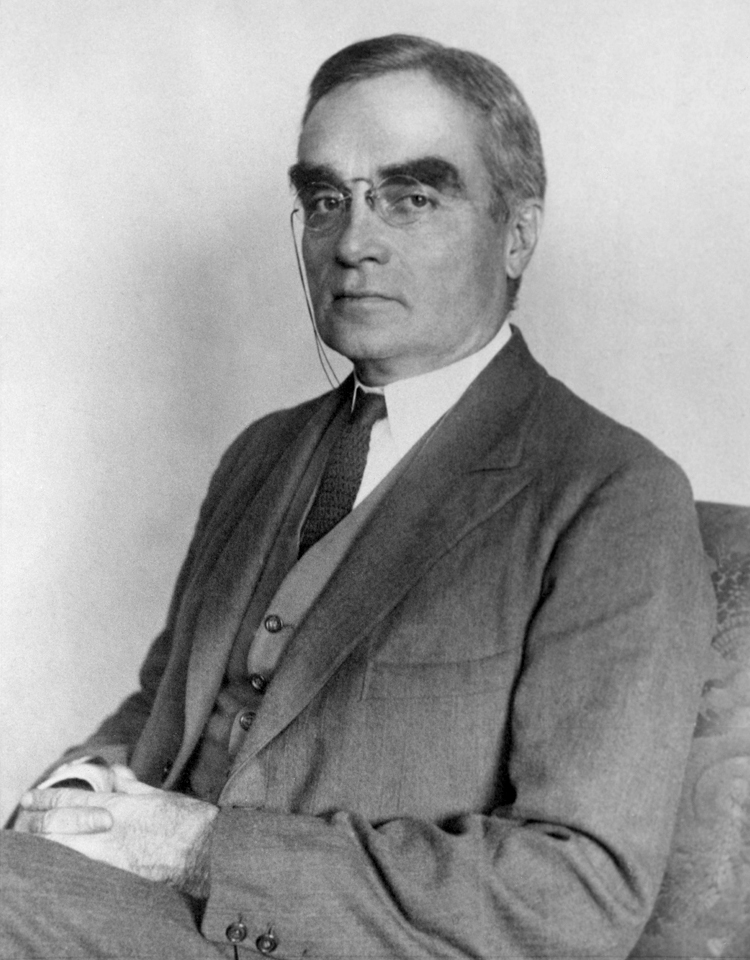
Learned Hand

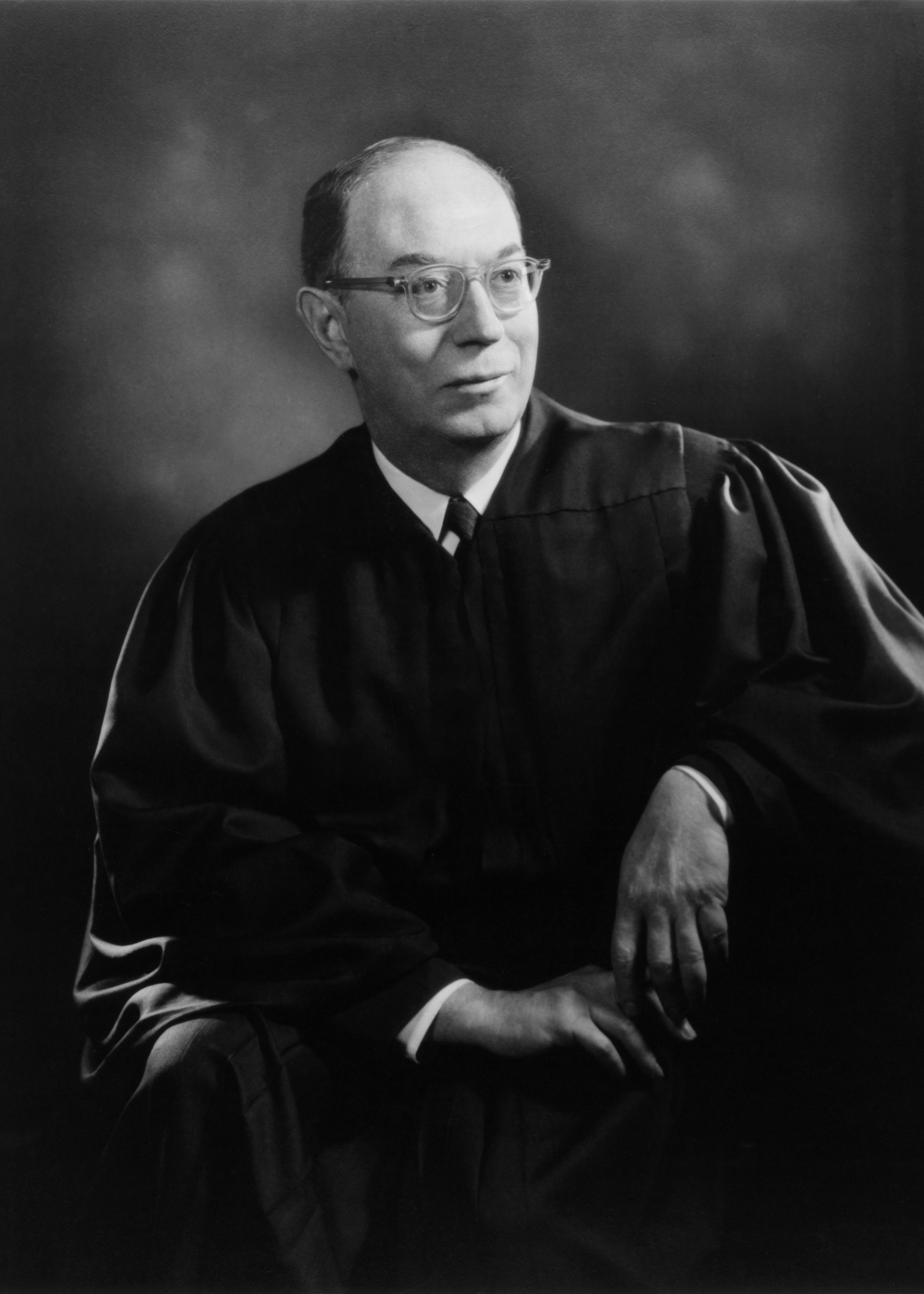
Henry Friendly

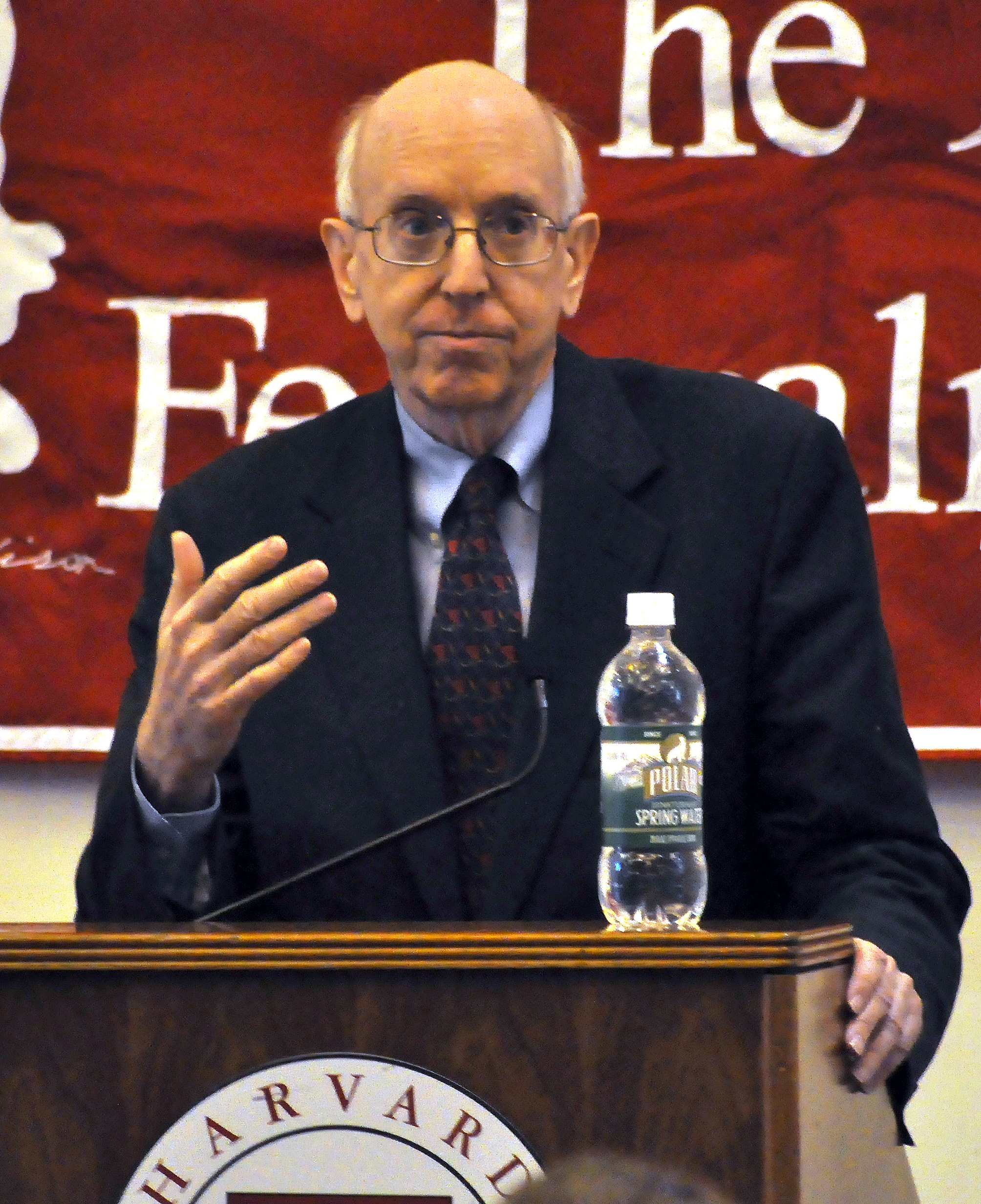
Richard Posner

Noted federal judges Michael Boudin of the First Circuit Court of Appeals, Joseph A. Greenaway of the Third Circuit Court of Appeals, Jennifer Walker Elrod of the United States Court of Appeals for the Fifth Circuit, Laurence Silberman of the D.C. Circuit Court of Appeals, Lawrence VanDyke of the Ninth Circuit Court of Appeals, and Pierre Leval of the Second Circuit Court of Appeals, among many other federal judges, graduated from the Harvard law School.

After graduating first in his class at Harvard Law in 1946, William Thaddeus Coleman Jr. became the first Black law clerk at the U.S. Supreme Court, in 1948 and he was later was appointed U.S. Secretary of Transportation in 1975.

Harvard Law School alumni include many prominent international figures in law and politics, such as former President of Taiwan, Ma Ying-jeou and former Vice President of Taiwan Annette Lu; former President of Ireland, Mary Robinson; President of Botswana, Duma Boko; former Prime Ministers of Peru, Roberto Danino and Beatriz Merino; Prime Minister of Luxembourg, Luc Frieden; former Deputy Prime Minister of the United Kingdom, David Lammy; President of the International Court of Justice, Yuji Iwasawa; Chief Justice of Australia, Stephen Gageler; former Chief Justice of India, Dhananjaya Y. Chandrachud; Chief Justice of the Court of Final Appeal of Hong Kong, Andrew Cheung Kui-nung; former Chief Justice of the Republic of the Philippines, Renato Corona; Chief Justice of Singapore, Sundaresh Menon; Justice of the Supreme Court of the United Kingdom, Lady Arden; Former Deputy Chief Justice of the Federal Supreme Court of Ethiopia, Solomon Areda Waktolla; former president of the World Bank Group, Robert Zoellick; former United Nations High Commissioner for Human Rights and Nobel Peace Prize laureate, Navanethem Pillay; and the first elected Sikyong of the Tibetan Government in Exile, Lobsang Sangay.

Many HLS alumni are leaders and innovators in the business world. Its graduates include the current senior chairman and former CEO of Goldman Sachs, Lloyd Blankfein; former CEO of American Express, Kenneth Chenault; former CEO of Merck & Co., Kenneth Frazier; former CEO of Reddit, Ellen Pao; founder of Viacom, former chairman of CBS Corporation, and majority owner of National Amusements, Sumner Redstone; current president and CEO of TIAA-CREF, Roger W. Ferguson Jr.; current CEO and chairman of Toys "R" Us, Gerald L. Storch; and former CEO of Delta Air Lines, Gerald Grinstein, among many other company founders, CEOs, and General Counsels.

Legal scholars who graduated from Harvard Law include Payam Akhavan, William P. Alford, Rachel Barkow, Yochai Benkler, Alexander Bickel, Andrew Burrows, Erwin Chemerinsky, Amy Chua, Sujit Choudhry, Robert C. Clark, Hugh Collins, James Joseph Duane, I. Glenn Cohen, Ronald Dworkin, Christopher Edley Jr., Melvin A. Eisenberg, Susan Estrich, Jody Freeman, Gerald Gunther, Andrew T. Guzman, Louis Henkin, William A. Jacobson, Harold Koh, Richard J. Lazarus, Arthur R. Miller, Gerald L. Neuman, Eric Posner, John Mark Ramseyer, Jed Rubenfeld, Lewis Sargentich, John Sexton, Jeannie Suk, Kathleen Sullivan, Cass Sunstein, Luke W. Cole, Laurence Tribe, Edwin R. Keedy, C. Raj Kumar, Michael Waterstone and Tim Wu.

In sports, David Otunga is the first and only Harvard Law alum to work for WWE. He is a two-time WWE Tag Team Champion.

=== Faculty ===
- William P. Alford
- Deborah Anker
- Yochai Benkler
- Robert C. Clark
- I. Glenn Cohen
- Susan P. Crawford
- Noah Feldman
- Roger Fisher
- William W. Fisher
- Jody Freeman
- Charles Fried
- Gerald Frug
- Nancy Gertner
- Mary Ann Glendon
- Jack Goldsmith
- David Alan Hoffman
- Morton Horwitz
- Vicki C. Jackson
- David Kennedy
- Duncan Kennedy
- Randall Kennedy
- Michael Klarman
- Richard J. Lazarus
- Lawrence Lessig
- Kenneth W. Mack
- John F. Manning
- Frank Michelman
- Martha Minow
- Robert Harris Mnookin
- Ashish Nanda
- Charles Nesson
- Gerald L. Neuman
- Ruth Okediji
- Charles Ogletree
- John Mark Ramseyer
- Mark J. Roe
- Lewis Sargentich
- Robert Sitkoff
- Jeannie Suk
- Ronald S. Sullivan Jr.
- Cass Sunstein
- Laurence Tribe
- Mark Tushnet
- Rebecca Tushnet
- Roberto Unger
- Adrian Vermeule
- Steven M. Wise
- Alicia Ely Yamin
- Jonathan Zittrain

==== Former faculty ====
- Phillip Areeda
- Paul M. Bator
- Joseph Henry Beale
- Derrick Bell
- Derek Bok
- Stephen Breyer
- Zechariah Chafee
- Abram Chayes
- Vern Countryman
- Archibald Cox
- Alan Dershowitz
- Christopher Edley Jr.
- Felix Frankfurter
- Paul A. Freund
- Lon Fuller
- John Chipman Gray
- Erwin Griswold
- Lani Guinier
- Henry M. Hart Jr.
- Oliver Wendell Holmes Jr.
- Wendy Jacobs
- Elena Kagan
- Christopher Columbus Langdell
- Louis Loss
- Daniel Meltzer
- Soia Mentschikoff
- Arthur R. Miller
- Elisabeth Owens
- John Palfrey
- Roscoe Pound
- John Rawls
- Joseph Story
- Kathleen Sullivan
- Elizabeth Warren
- Joseph H. H. Weiler
- Samuel Williston

== See also ==
- Ames Moot Court Competition
- Harvard Association for Law & Business
- Harvard/MIT Cooperative Society
- Lincoln's Inn Society
- List of Harvard University people
- List of Ivy League law schools
