= List of Radcliffe College people =

The following is a list of individuals associated with Radcliffe College through attending as a student, or serving as college president or dean.

== List of presidents ==
- Elizabeth Cabot Agassiz, 1894–1900 (honorary president 1900–1903)
- LeBaron Russell Briggs, 1903–1923
- Ada Louise Comstock, 1923–1943
- Wilbur Kitchener Jordan, 1943–1960
- Mary Bunting, 1960–1972
- Matina Horner, 1972–1989
- Linda Wilson, 1989–1999

== Deans ==
- Frances R. Brown, American educator and college president
- Agnes Irwin (1894–1909), American educator

== Notable alumnae ==
=== Architects and landscape architects ===
- Judith Ledeboer, architect
- Ellen Biddle Shipman, landscape architect (left after one year)
- Anne Whiston Spirn, landscape architect

=== Art and architecture historians ===
- Leila Cook Barber, MA degree 1928, art historian and professor emeritus at Vassar College, specializing in Renaissance art and medieval studies
- Mary Berenson (1864–1945), Harvard Annex student 1884–1885, art historian
- Katharine Seymour Day, historical preservationist
- Florence M. Montgomery (1914–1998), art historian and curator at Winterthur Museum, Garden and Library
- Eva Moseley, curator and archivist
- Phoebe Stanton (1914–2003), MA 1939, architectural historian, professor at Johns Hopkins University, and urban planner for Baltimore
- Helen Woodruff (1899–1980), MA, PhD 1929, art historian, manuscript scholar, curator, and educator

=== Lawyers and judges ===
- Deborah Batts, judge
- Cora Agnes Benneson, attorney, lecturer, and writer
- Marsha Berzon, judge
- Elaine Denniston, lawyer, supported the Apollo program
- Jennifer Gordon, workers rights activist, lawyer
- Dayna Bowen Matthew, law school dean
- Karen Nelson Moore, judge

=== Physicians ===
- Sara Murray Jordan, gastroenterologist
- Judith Palfrey, pediatrician and author
- Carla J. Shatz, neuroscientist
- Nancy Wexler, geneticist

=== Writers, poets, journalists, and editor ===
- Virginia Hamilton Adair, poet
- Alice Adams, writer
- Fannie Fern Andrews, writer
- Margaret Atwood, 1961, author
- Marita Bonner, writer, playwright
- Elizabeth Brewster, poet
- Barbara Epstein, literary editor
- Anne Fadiman, essayist and reporter
- Norma Farber, children's book writer and poet
- Anne Garrels, journalist
- Katharine Fullerton Gerould, novelist
- Amy Goodman, journalist and political activist
- Ellen Goodman, journalist and writer
- Joyce Ballou Gregorian, 1968, science fiction author
- Rachel Hadas, poet, teacher, essayist, and translator
- Rona Jaffe, author
- Helen Keller, deaf blind writer, activist
- Maxine Kumin, poet and author
- Jean Kwok, author
- Ursula K. Le Guin, writer, poet
- Alison Lurie, writer
- Michel McQueen Martin, 1980, journalist
- Anne McCaffrey, 1947, science fiction author
- Priscilla Johnson McMillan, MA 1953, journalist, translator, author, historian
- Daisy Newman, writer
- Andrea Nye, feminist philosopher and writer
- Clara Claiborne Park (1923–2010), author who raised awareness of autism
- Linda Pastan, poet
- Josephine Preston Peabody, poet
- Katha Pollitt, poet, essayist and critic
- Francine Prose, writer
- Julia Quinn, New York Times best-selling author
- Helen Leah Reed, writer
- Adrienne Rich, poet
- Margot Roosevelt, journalist
- Elsie Singmaster, author
- Gertrude Stein, writer, poet, playwright and feminist
- Lily Tuck, novelist and short story writer
- Jean Valentine, poet
- Hannah Weiner, poet
- Natalie Wexler, novelist
- Lally Weymouth, journalist
- Ruth Whitman, poet
- Charlotte Wilder, MA, poet; eldest sister of Thornton Wilder

=== Others ===
- Elizabeth Bailey, economist
- Amelia Muir Baldwin, interior designer and women's suffrage activist
- Tryphosa Bates-Batcheller, singer
- Gail Lee Bernstein, Japanese historian
- Susan Berresford, 1965, president of the Ford Foundation 1996–2007
- Benazir Bhutto, first woman elected to lead a Muslim state, prime minister of Pakistan (1988–1990; 1993–1996)
- Melissa Block, radio journalist, co-host, All Things Considered
- Thérèse Bonney, photographer and publicist
- Jane Britton, 1967, murdered while a graduate student at Harvard University
- Stockard Channing, actress, famous for her roles in Grease and The West Wing
- Nancy Chodorow, sociologist
- Judy Clapp, 1952, computer scientist
- Zoe Cruz, business, co-president of Morgan Stanley (most powerful woman on Wall Street)
- Frances Gardiner Davenport (1870–1927), historian of the later Middle Ages and the European colonization
- Natalie Zemon Davis, historian of the early modern period
- Elisabeth Deichmann (1896–1975), Danish-born American marine biologist
- Jane Dempsey Douglass, feminist theologian, ecclesiastical historian, and president of the World Alliance of Reformed Churches
- Peggy Dulany, heiress and philanthropist
- Eva Beatrice Dykes, academic
- Debbie Ellison, model
- Rebecca Elson, writer and astronomer
- Ann Kindrick Fischer, social anthropologist
- Abigail Folger, 1964, coffee heiress, debutante, socialite, volunteer social worker, civil rights devotee
- Mary Parker Follett, social worker, management consultant, and philosopher
- Carol Gilligan, feminist, ethicist, and psychologist
- Susanna Grannis, academic and nonprofit organizer
- Phyllis Granoff, academic of Indic religions
- Linda Greenhouse, legal journalist
- Marjorie Grene, philosopher
- Gisela Kahn Gresser, chess player
- Lani Guinier, legal scholar and civil rights theorist
- Amy Gutmann, current president of the University of Pennsylvania
- Virginia Hall, SOE spy
- Olive Hazlett, mathematician
- Diana Mara Henry, photographer
- Helen Sawyer Hogg, astronomer
- Elizabeth Holtzman, politician
- Elizabeth Ellis Hoyt, economist
- Elizabeth Hubbard, actress
- Ruth Hubbard, professor, biologist, feminist
- Josephine Hull, stage and film actress
- Leslie P. Hume, historian and philanthropist
- Catharine Sargent Huntington, actress, producer, director, founder of multiple theater companies, activist
- Lydia P. Jackson, former Louisiana state legislator
- Nancy Johnson, politician
- Roberta Karmel (born 1937), Centennial Professor of Law at Brooklyn Law School, and first female commissioner of the U.S. Securities and Exchange Commission
- Sinah Estelle Kelley, chemist
- Caroline Kennedy, author and diplomat
- Susanne Langer, philosopher
- Mary Lasker, health activist and philanthropist
- Henrietta Swan Leavitt, astronomer
- Mary Lefkowitz, scholar of Classics
- Edith Lesley, academic and founder of Lesley University
- Ann Lewis, political advisor
- Princess Christina, Mrs. Magnuson, Swedish princess
- Pauline Maier, historian
- Emily Mann (BA English literature 1974), director
- Elizabeth Holloway Marston, MA 1921, involved in the creation of the comic book character Wonder Woman
- Helen Reimensnyder Martin, novelist
- Jessica Mathews
- Jean Trepp McKelvey (1908–1998), economist
- Laura Meneses, political activist
- Alice Vanderbilt Morris
- Chris Mulford, AB 1963, breastfeeding advocate
- Laura Nader, professor in controlling processes
- Gertrude Neumark, physicist
- Ursula Oppens, classical pianist
- Deborah Orin, journalist
- Mary White Ovington, activist, NAACP founder
- Masako Owada, 1985, empress of Japan
- Cecilia Payne-Gaposchkin, astronomer
- Ann Hunter Popkin, women's rights activist
- Carol Potter, actress
- Sue Pritzker, socialite, philanthropist, and activist, member of the Pritzker family
- Bonnie Raitt (attended one year), Grammy Award-winning singer and musician
- Philinda Rand, English-language teacher in the Philippines
- Lois Rice, 1954, vice president of the College Board and architect of the Pell Grant
- Emeline Hill Richardson, archeologist
- Alice Rivlin, economist
- Helen Jean Rogers, television producer
- Judith Ann Wilson Rogers
- Michelle Rosaldo, anthropologist
- Phyllis Schlafly, political activist, coined term "A choice not an echo"
- Ellen Schrecker, historian
- Mary Sears, oceanographer
- Edie Sedgwick (attended), iconic American socialite and Warhol superstar
- Judith Shuval, sociologist
- H. Catherine W. Skinner, geologist and mineralogist
- Diane B. Snelling, politician
- Cynthia Solomon, computer scientist, co-designer of Logo (programming language), and co-developer of LCSI Logo
- Diane Souvaine, computer scientist
- Edith G. Stedman, 1910, head of the Appointment Bureau 1930–1954
- Doris Zemurray Stone, 1930 (1909–1994), archaeologist and ethnographer of pre-Columbian Mesoamerican cultures
- Mary E. Switzer, public administrator and social reformer
- Martha J. B. Thomas, (1926–2006), PhD MBA, chemical engineer
- Caroline Thompson, screenwriter-director
- Orlando E. Toledo, author and essayist
- Barbara W. Tuchman, historian and author
- Abby Howe Turner, zoologist
- Ruth Turner, marine biologist
- Julie Vargas, educator
- Emily Vermeule, archeologist
- Maribel Vinson, figure skater
- Caroline F. Ware, historian
- Ruth Wendell Washburn, educational psychologist
- Marina von Neumann Whitman, economist
- Liz Williamson, dancer and choreographer
- Olive Winchester, professor at the Point Loma, Northwest, and Eastern Nazarene colleges
- Marie Winn, ornithologist
- Charlotte Todes, labor organizer
