= Columbia Publishing Course =

Summer course on publishing

The Columbia Publishing Course
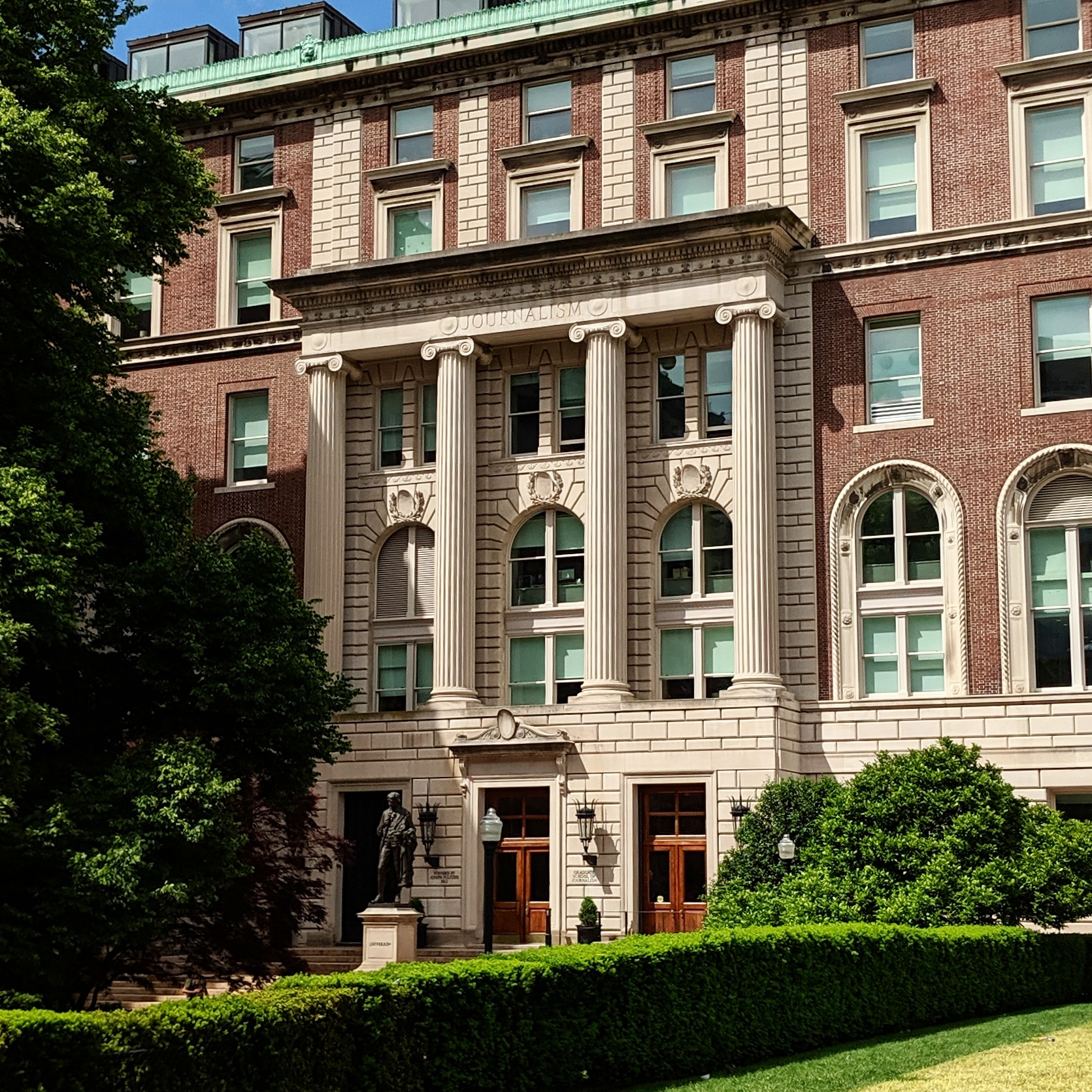
- Pulitzer Hall at Columbia University. Home of the Columbia Publishing Course.
- Former name: Radcliffe Publishing Course
- Type: Private graduate certification
- Established: 1947
- Parent institution: Columbia University
- Director: Shaye Areheart
- Students: ~100 per year
- Location: New York City
- Website: journalism.columbia.edu/cpc-ny

The Columbia Publishing Course, formerly known as the Radcliffe Publishing Course at Harvard University, is a graduate-level program on book and magazine publishing at Columbia University.

== History ==
The publishing program was established in 1947 within Radcliffe College, at Harvard University, in Cambridge, Massachusetts by Edith Gratia Stedman, as a training course for recent graduates entering the American and English publishing industry. The program became co-ed in 1949. In 1998, at the 50th anniversary celebration of the program, The Harvard Crimson described the program as "the most prestigious in the nation," and "the premier training ground for publishing's future leaders."

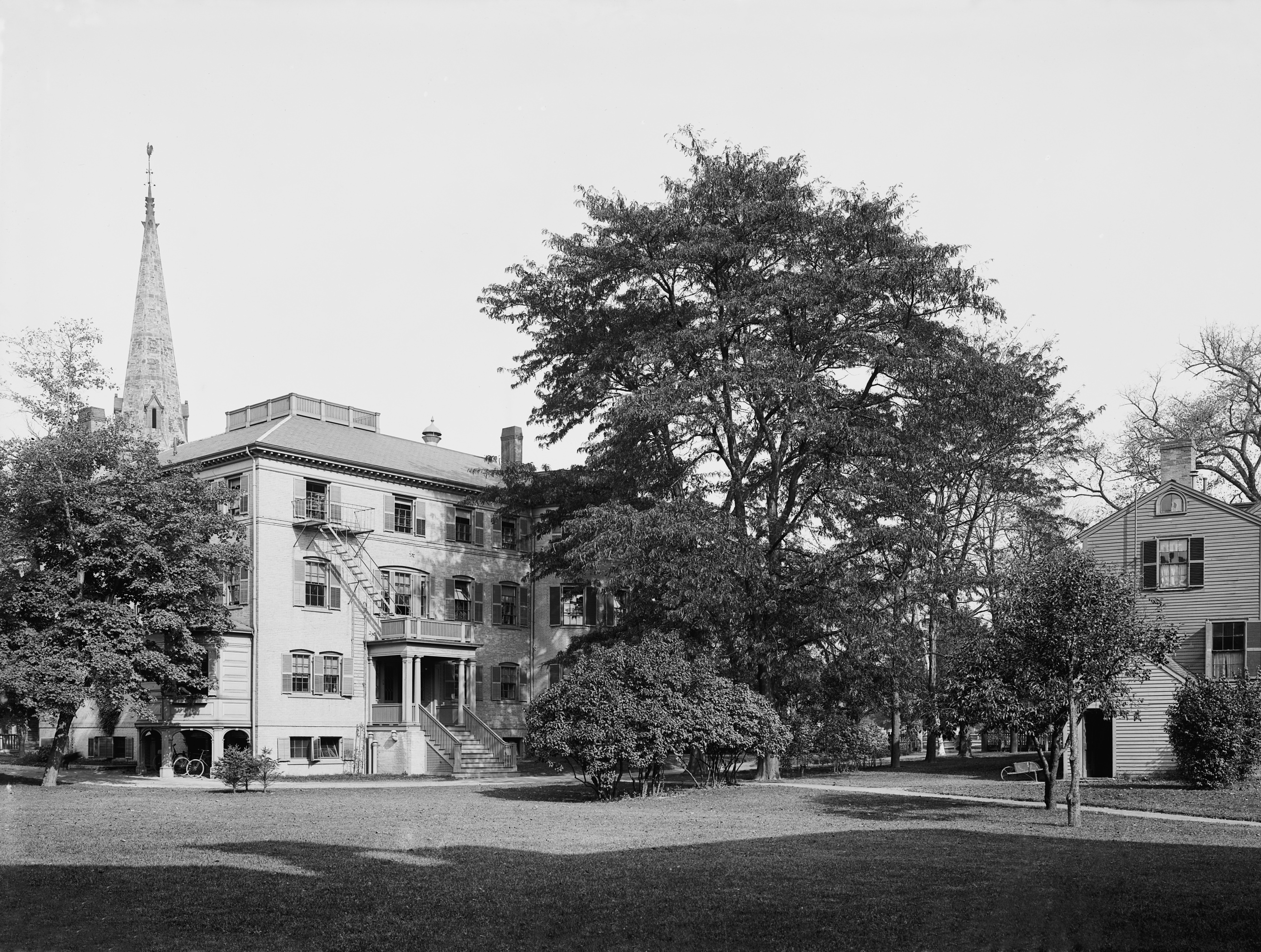
Radcliffe College, 1947

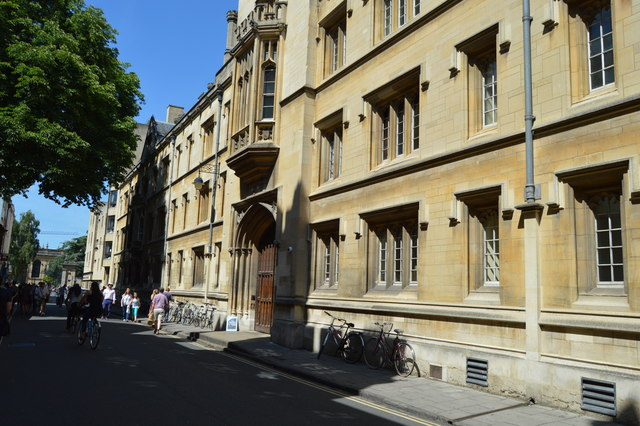
Exeter College, University of Oxford

In 2000, when Radcliffe was integrated into Harvard University, the program was moved to Pulitzer Hall at the Columbia University Graduate School of Journalism in New York City. The Columbia Publishing Course inaugurated an intensive sister program in September at Exeter College, University of Oxford, in Oxford, England, focused on the history and practice of book publishing, in 2016.

== Notable graduates ==
- Jon Gould, Rolling Stone and Outside
- Lee Bourdeaux, Ecco Press
- Christopher Carduff, Wall Street Journal book editor
- David Davidar, Penguin India
- Morgan Entrekin, publisher of Grove Atlantic
- Steven Florio, president of Conde Nast Publications
- David M. Granger, editor-in-chief of Esquire
- Jazmine Hughes, New York Times Magazine editor
- Madeline McIntosh, CEO of Penguin Random House
- Jim Murphy, author
- Victor Navasky, publisher and editor of The Nation
- Jordan Pavlin, editor-in-chief of Knopf
- Jeffrey L. Seglin, Senior Lecturer Emeritus, Harvard Kennedy School and syndicated ethics columnist.

== See also ==
- Radcliffe College, Harvard University
- Book publishing in New York, New York
- Book publishing in London, United Kingdom
- Columbia University Graduate School of Journalism
