= Hasty Pudding Man of the Year =

Theatrical award at Harvard University

The Hasty Pudding Man of the Year award is bestowed annually by the Hasty Pudding Theatricals society at Harvard University. It has been awarded since 1967 to performers deemed by the society members to have made a "lasting and impressive contribution to the world of entertainment".

The Man of the Year recipient is traditionally invited to Harvard Square for various events in his honor before the opening night of the Hasty Pudding show. These include a tour of historic Harvard Yard with entertainment by the Radcliffe Pitches, and culminate with a dinner and roast by the Hasty Pudding Theatricals members.

In 1998, The Harvard Lampoon awarded their own "Real Man of the Year" award to the Macho Man Randy Savage, who challenged that year's Man of the Year, Kevin Kline, to a wrestling match.

== Recipients ==
Below is a list of the men who have received the award:

- 1967 – Bob Hope
- 1968 – Paul Newman
- 1969 – Bill Cosby
- 1970 – Robert Redford
- 1971 – James Stewart
- 1972 – Dustin Hoffman
- 1973 – Jack Lemmon
- 1974 – Peter Falk
- 1975 – Warren Beatty
- 1976 – Robert Blake
- 1977 – Johnny Carson
- 1978 – Richard Dreyfuss
- 1979 – Robert De Niro
- 1980 – Alan Alda
- 1981 – John Travolta
- 1982 – James Cagney
- 1983 – Steven Spielberg
- 1984 – Sean Connery
- 1985 – Bill Murray
- 1986 – Sylvester Stallone
- 1987 – Mikhail Baryshnikov
- 1988 – Steve Martin
- 1989 – Robin Williams
- 1990 – Kevin Costner
- 1991 – Clint Eastwood
- 1992 – Michael Douglas
- 1993 – Chevy Chase
- 1994 – Tom Cruise
- 1995 – Tom Hanks
- 1996 – Harrison Ford
- 1997 – Mel Gibson
- 1998 – Kevin Kline
- 1999 – Samuel L. Jackson
- 2000 – Billy Crystal
- 2001 – Anthony Hopkins
- 2002 – Bruce Willis
- 2003 – Martin Scorsese
- 2004 – Robert Downey Jr.
- 2005 – Tim Robbins
- 2006 – Richard Gere
- 2007 – Ben Stiller
- 2008 – Christopher Walken
- 2009 – James Franco
- 2010 – Justin Timberlake
- 2011 – Jay Leno
- 2012 – Jason Segel
- 2013 – Kiefer Sutherland
- 2014 – Neil Patrick Harris
- 2015 – Chris Pratt
- 2016 – Joseph Gordon-Levitt
- 2017 – Ryan Reynolds
- 2018 – Paul Rudd
- 2019 – Milo Ventimiglia
- 2020 – Ben Platt
- 2022 – Jason Bateman
- 2023 – Bob Odenkirk
- 2024 – Barry Keoghan
- 2025 – Jon Hamm
- 2026 – Michael Keaton

== See also ==
- Hasty Pudding Woman of the Year
