= Radcliffe Pitches =

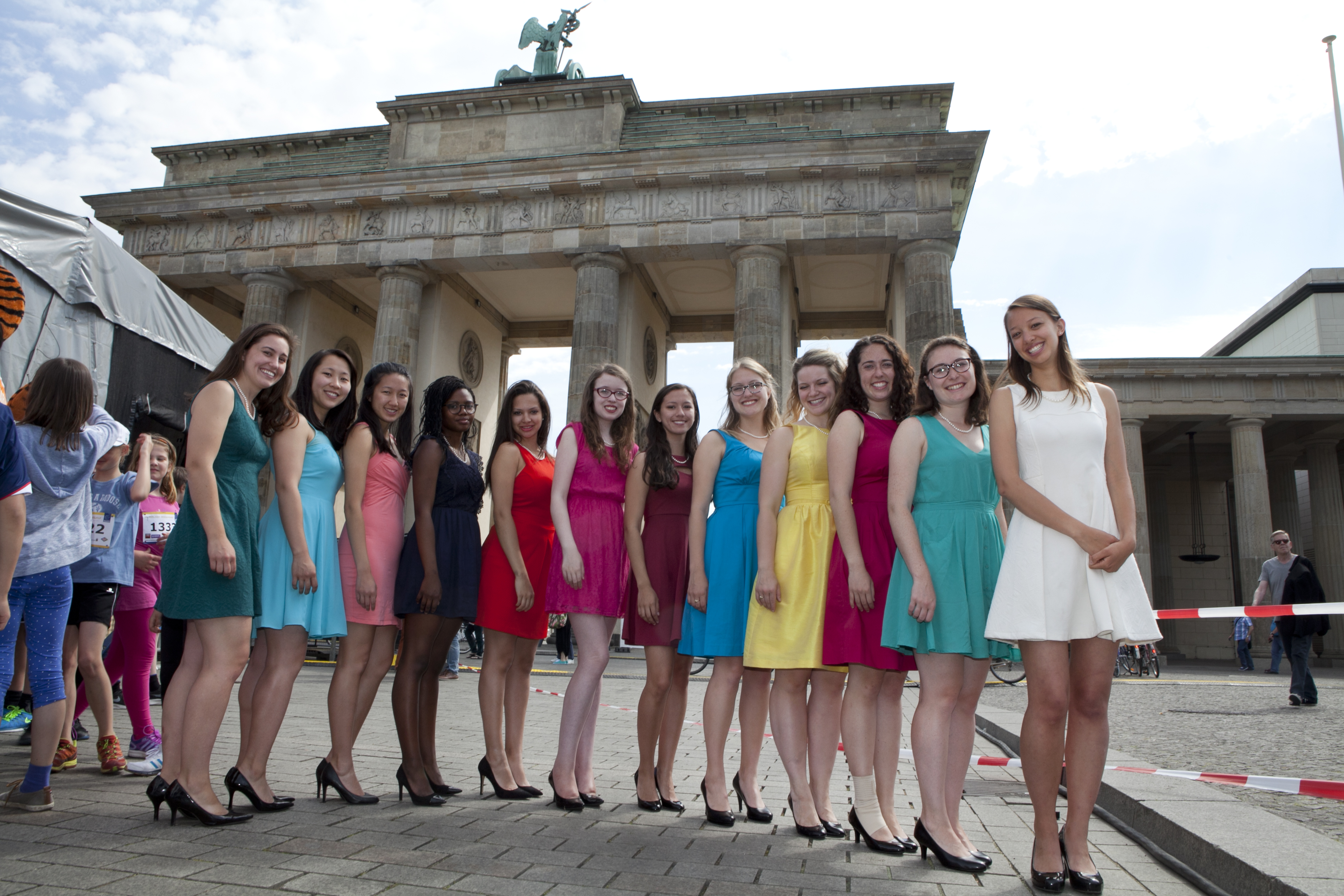
- The Radcliffe Pitches at the Brandenburg Gate in Berlin, 2015

Background information
- Origin: Harvard University, Cambridge, Massachusetts, U.S.
- Genre: A cappella
- Years active: 1975–present

The Radcliffe Pitches are the premier treble-voiced a cappella singing ensemble at Harvard University, founded in 1975 at the Hasty Pudding Club. The group is made up of 12 to 14 Harvard undergraduates who perform at Harvard and internationally on the group's various tours. During their tours, the group has traveled within the U.S. and to international destinations including Bermuda, Spain, England, France, Germany, China and several other countries. The Pitches also perform regularly on the Harvard campus; they can be heard at large concerts in Sanders Theatre and smaller gigs including The Annual Breast Cancer Awareness Jam alongside other all-female ensembles in Cabot Café. Other notable performances include appearances at the 1993 inauguration celebrations for President Bill Clinton and the Hasty Pudding Man of the Year awards.

The Pitches' repertoire is based in jazz standards and inspired by artists such as Ella Fitzgerald and Frank Sinatra. Songs in their repertoire include: "Whatever Lola Wants", "It Don't Mean a Thing (If It Ain't Got That Swing)", and "My Funny Valentine". The Pitches also perform jazz twists to popular songs, for example; an arrangement of "American Boy" by Estelle which they performed in Sanders Theatre Spring 2015 at their 40th Anniversary Jam. All of the Pitch arrangements are done specifically for the group by current and previous members of the group and friends of the group.

The group's founders were Radcliffe College undergraduates who wanted to sing in a close harmony setting. The original Pitches chose their group's name from a number of entries in a campus naming contest. In the words of co-founder Kathy Manning (Radcliffe College Class of 1978):

"We finally settled on a take-off of the rather negative phrase that had been used to describe Radcliffe women for ages. We actually liked the resemblance to that old adage, because we wanted to be known as a group that was gutsy, tough and high quality."

The Pitches choose new group members through an audition process, held in the fall and spring of each academic year and open to all Harvard undergraduates.

== Selected Repertoire ==
- A Nightingale Sang in Berkeley Square
- Anything Goes
- Baby, I Love You
- Bei Mir Bist Du Schön
- Big Girls Don't Cry
- Boogie Woogie Bugle Boy
- Don't Tell Mama
- Fire
- House of Blue Lights
- It Don't Mean a Thing (If It Ain't Got That Swing)
- It's My Party
- It's Raining Men
- I’ve Been Loving You
- Mack the Knife
- Makin’ Whoopee
- Mr. Sandman
- My Funny Valentine
- My Baby Just Cares for Me
- Never Will I Marry
- Oh! Darling
- Orange Colored Sky
- Our Love is Here to Stay
- Precious
- Roxanne
- Saving All My Love for You
- Say a Little Prayer
- That Old Feeling
- The Masquerade Is Over
- This Could Be the Start of Something Great
- Trashin’ the Camp
- Tuxedo Junction
- Whatever Lola Wants (Lola Gets)
- What a Wonderful World
- You'd Be Surprised
- You Don't Own Me
