= Hasty Pudding Woman of the Year =

Annual theatrical award

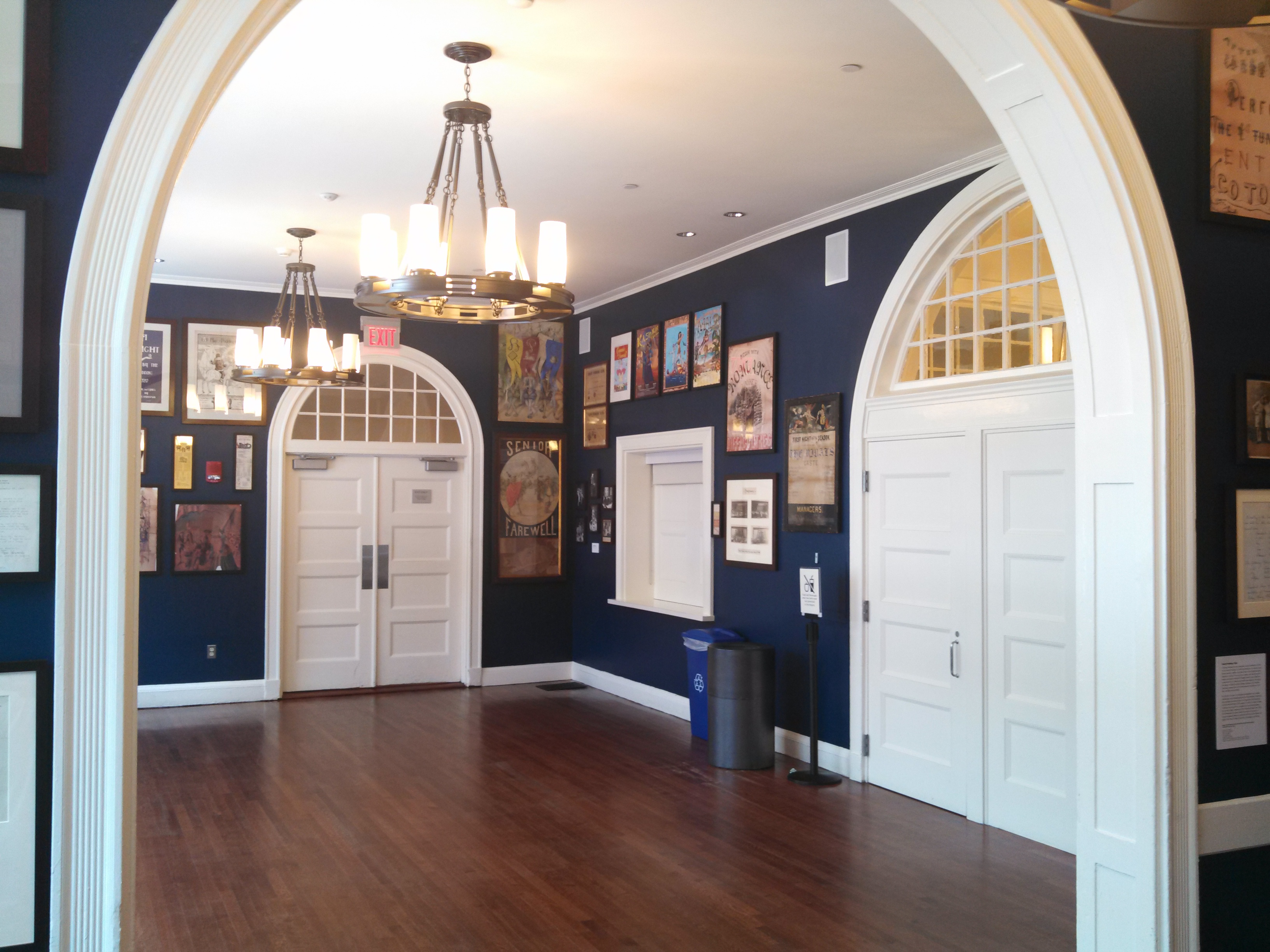
The Hasty Pudding Lobby, 12 Holyoke Street, Cambridge Massachusetts

The Hasty Pudding Woman of the Year award is bestowed annually by the Hasty Pudding Theatricals society at Harvard University. The award was created in 1951, and its first recipient was Gertrude Lawrence, an English actress, singer, and dancer. It has since been awarded annually by the society members of the Hasty Pudding to performers deemed to have made a "lasting and impressive contribution to the world of entertainment".

The Woman of the Year recipient is traditionally treated to a day of celebrations in her honor, including a parade through Harvard Square accompanied by members of the Hasty Pudding Theatricals and Pudding-affiliated organizations. This is usually followed by a celebratory dinner and entertainment by the Harvard Krokodiloes.

Below is a list of the women who have received the award:

== Recipients ==
- 1951 – Gertrude Lawrence
- 1952 – Barbara Bel Geddes
- 1953 – Mamie Eisenhower
- 1954 – Shirley Booth
- 1955 – Debbie Reynolds
- 1956 – Peggy Ann Garner
- 1957 – Carroll Baker
- 1958 – Katharine Hepburn
- 1959 – Joanne Woodward
- 1960 – Carol Lawrence
- 1961 – Jane Fonda
- 1962 – Piper Laurie
- 1963 – Shirley MacLaine
- 1964 – Rosalind Russell
- 1965 – Lee Remick
- 1966 – Ethel Merman
- 1967 – Lauren Bacall
- 1968 – Angela Lansbury
- 1969 – Carol Burnett
- 1970 – Dionne Warwick
- 1971 – Carol Channing
- 1972 – Ruby Keeler
- 1973 – Liza Minnelli
- 1974 – Faye Dunaway
- 1975 – Valerie Harper
- 1976 – Bette Midler
- 1977 – Elizabeth Taylor
- 1978 – Beverly Sills
- 1979 – Candice Bergen
- 1980 – Meryl Streep
- 1981 – Mary Tyler Moore
- 1982 – Ella Fitzgerald
- 1983 – Julie Andrews
- 1984 – Joan Rivers
- 1985 – Cher
- 1986 – Sally Field
- 1987 – Bernadette Peters
- 1988 – Lucille Ball
- 1989 – Kathleen Turner
- 1990 – Glenn Close
- 1991 – Diane Keaton
- 1992 – Jodie Foster
- 1993 – Whoopi Goldberg
- 1994 – Meg Ryan
- 1995 – Michelle Pfeiffer
- 1996 – Susan Sarandon
- 1997 – Julia Roberts
- 1998 – Sigourney Weaver
- 1999 – Goldie Hawn
- 2000 – Jamie Lee Curtis
- 2001 – Drew Barrymore
- 2002 – Sarah Jessica Parker
- 2003 – Anjelica Huston
- 2004 – Sandra Bullock
- 2005 – Catherine Zeta-Jones
- 2006 – Halle Berry
- 2007 – Scarlett Johansson
- 2008 – Charlize Theron
- 2009 – Renée Zellweger
- 2010 – Anne Hathaway
- 2011 – Julianne Moore
- 2012 – Claire Danes
- 2013 – Marion Cotillard
- 2014 – Helen Mirren
- 2015 – Amy Poehler
- 2016 – Kerry Washington
- 2017 – Octavia Spencer
- 2018 – Mila Kunis
- 2019 – Bryce Dallas Howard
- 2020 – Elizabeth Banks
- 2021 – Viola Davis
- 2022 – Jennifer Garner
- 2023 – Jennifer Coolidge
- 2024 – Annette Bening
- 2025 – Cynthia Erivo
- 2026 – Rose Byrne

== See also ==
- Hasty Pudding Man of the Year
