= Edith G. Stedman =

American social worker (1888–1978)

Edith G. Stedman OBE
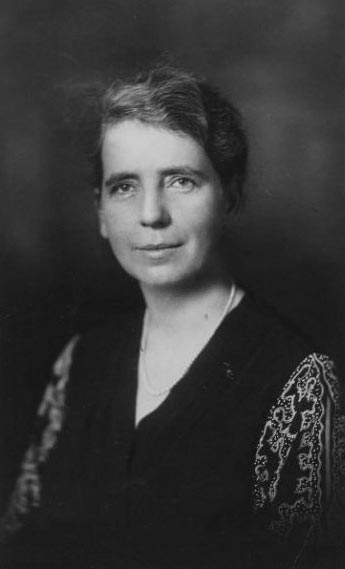
- Edith Stedman, before 1941
- Born: December 29, 1888; Cambridge, Massachusetts
- Died: July 16, 1978 (aged 89)
- Occupation: social worker

Edith Gratia Stedman OBE (December 29, 1888 - July 16, 1978) was an American social worker, educator, writer and volunteer. She is best known for her vocational programming created at Radcliffe starting in the Great Depression and also for her help in restoring Dorchester Abbey.

== Biography ==
Stedman was born in Cambridge, Massachusetts, and the family later moved to Belmont, Massachusetts, where she attended high school. Stedman enjoyed high school, writing, "I think I worked harder and got more academic pleasure out of some of my work in high school than I ever did in college." She went on to Radcliffe College where she graduated in 1910.

After school, she worked for a time at the Framingham Reformatory for Women until her brother convinced her to quit in order to run the family's candy store, a job she later discovered she hated. After two years, she quit and went to Europe with the YMCA to help the war effort there in 1917. She was a canteen worker in France and Germany working for the YMCA until 1919. Back in the United States, Stedman did not find work that interested her. Stedman then traveled to China in 1920, where she worked as a medical social worker in Hankou at an Episocopal Mission. She stayed until 1927, returning to Boston, where she started working as an executive secretary for the Judge Baker Foundation.

Ada Louise Comstock invited Stedman to come for the Appointment Bureau at Radcliffe in 1930. Stedman developed vocational programs for women in the 1930s. Undergraduates and graduate students were both helped by Stedman in finding employment. She created and directed the Training Course in Personnel Administration and supported professional training for women. Stedman worked as the director of the Training Course until 1941. Students could be awarded a fellowship grant in her name. She also created the Radcliffe Publishing Course, which has launched the careers of many editors and still continues today as a part of Columbia University. Stedman stayed at Radcliffe until 1954, when she retired.

As a retiree, she worked as a volunteer in different capacities. Between 1955 and 1959, Stedman volunteered at the Peter Bent Brigham Hospital. In 1959, she started spending half the year living with friends at the Manor House, Dorchester. Stedman created a group, the American Friends of Dorchester Abbey, which raised money for both the Abbey and the surrounding gardens. Stedman also wrote during her retirement.

Her last years were spent living in Sherrill House, a nursing home in Boston run by the Episcopal church. She lived with Ménière's disease and had deafness. Stedman died in Boston on July 16, 1978.

== Legacy ==
Stedman was awarded as an Officer of the Order of the British Empire in 1976 for her work supporting the restoration of Dorchester Abbey. She was given the award at the British embassy in Washington, D.C. A stone carving of Stedman is located above the west door of the Abbey.

== Selected bibliography ==
- "The House of the Merciful Saviour: A Training School for Social Workers" (1924)
- A Monastery Guest House Cook Book. Dorchester Abbey. 1965. OCLC 15133614.
- A Yankee in an English Village. Cambridge, Massachusetts: Creative Editing. 1972. OCLC 50066675.
- Finger Prints. Boston: Friends of Dorchester Abbey. 1977. OCLC 61723030.
