= Jeffrey L. Seglin =

American columnist, author, and teacher (born 1956)

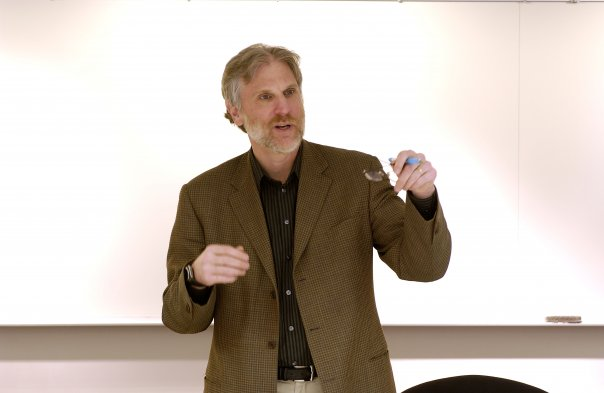
- Born: December 26, 1956 (age 69); Plattsburgh, New York
- Education: M.T.S., Harvard University, B.A., Bethany College
- Occupations: writer, columnist, teacher

Jeffrey L. Seglin (born December 26, 1956) is an American columnist, author, and teacher. He is currently a senior lecturer, emeritus, at the Harvard Kennedy School at Harvard University. From 2011 until 2023, he was a senior lecturer and director of the communications program at the John F. Kennedy School of Government at Harvard University. He consults widely on writing, communications, and ethics. His weekly column on ethics, "The Right Thing," is syndicated in newspapers in the United States and Canada. Seglin lives in Boston with his wife, a psychotherapist. He has two adult children, four grandchildren, and one great grandchild.

== Early life and education ==
Seglin was born in Plattsburgh, New York, and grew up in many cities in the northeastern U.S. as well as Santiago, Chile. He attended Boonton High School in Boonton, New Jersey. He holds a master's degree in theological studies from Harvard Divinity School, a bachelor's degree from Bethany College, and an honorary doctorate from Bethany College. He began his college career at Washington and Lee University and Christopher Newport College. He attended the Radcliffe Publishing Course in 1978.

== Career ==
Seglin is the author or co-author on more than a dozen books on business, ethics, and writing. He has written for publications including The New York Times, Real Simple, Fortune, Fortune Small Business, Salon.com, Time, Sojourners, MIT's Sloan Management Review, Harvard Management Update, Business 2.0, ForbesASAP, CIO, CFO, and MBA Jungle. He has contributed commentaries to American Public Media's Marketplace radio program and was the host of Doing Well by Doing Good, an hour-long live television program airing out of WCVE-TV, PBS's Richmond, Virginia affiliate.

Prior to 1998, he was an executive editor at Inc. magazine. He was also the editor of The New York Times Global Business Perspectives news service from 2007 until 2014.

Seglin's "The Right Thing" column launched as a monthly column in the Sunday Money & Business section of The New York Times in September 1998 and ran the third Sunday of each month until 2004, when it became a weekly syndicated column.

In his syndicated column, "The Right Thing," he offers solutions to ethical dilemmas posed by readers. The column was syndicated by The New York Times Syndicate from February 2004 through August 2010. In September 2010, Tribune Content Agency began distributing "The Right Thing" column.

In 2003, Seglin published The Right Thing: Conscience, Profit and Personal Responsibility in Today’s Business, a collection of the first four years of his syndicated column. It was named as one of the "Best Business Books of 2003" by the Library Journal. He is also the author of The Good, the Bad, and Your Business: Choosing Right When Ethical Dilemmas Pull You Apart (Wiley, 2000).

In 2016, Seglin's The Simple Art of Business Etiquette: How to Rise to the Top by Playing Nice (Tycho, 2016) was released. The book reached a Publishers Weekly bestseller list.

== Academia ==
Seglin worked at Emerson College in Boston, Massachusetts from 1999 until 2011, where he was a tenured associate professor and also director of the graduate program in publishing and writing. He has been an ethics fellow at the Poynter Institute for Media Studies since 2001 and was a resident fellow at the Center for the Study of Values in Public Life at Harvard University in 1998-1999. Seglin is currently a senior lecturer, emeritus, at the John F. Kennedy School of Government at Harvard University. From 2011 until 2023 he was a senior lecturer in public policy and director of the communications program at the John F. Kennedy School of Government at Harvard University.

He lectures widely on ethics, business ethics, and writing, including sessions at the Nieman Foundation, Harvard Medical School, Harvard T.H. Chan School of Public Health, University Mohammed VI Polytechnic, the Defense Information School (DINFOS), the Executive MBA Program at University of Wisconsin–Madison, Duke Corporate Education, Harvard Business School Publishing Virtual Seminars, Virginia Commonwealth University, and other organizations.

He also served as a consultant on the business ethics module of Harvard ManageMentor.

== Awards ==
Trust Across America named Seglin as one of the Top 100 Thought Leaders in Trustworthy Business Behavior from 2010-2014, and honored him with the organization's Lifetime Achievement Award in January 2015.

The student body of Harvard Kennedy School presented Seglin with the Manuel C. Carballo Award for Excellence in Teaching in May 2017. He was co-recipient of the Carballo Award in May 2014.

Bethany College awarded Seglin a Doctor of Humane Letters on March 6, 2014.

== Selected works ==
- The Simple Art of Business Etiquette: How to Rise to the Top by Playing Nice. Tycho, 2016. ISBN 1-623156-88-2 ISBN 978-1623156886
- The Right Thing: Conscience, Profit and Personal Responsibility in Today’s Business. Spiro Press, 2003. ISBN 1-904298-97-4 ISBN 978-1904298977 Smith-Kerr, 2006. ISBN 0-9786899-0-9 ISBN 978-0978689902
- The Good, the Bad, and Your Business: Choosing Right When Ethical Dilemmas Pull You Apart. New York: Wiley, 2000. ISBN 0-471-34779-5 ISBN 978-0471347798 Smith-Kerr, 2007.ISBN 0978689933 ISBN 978-0-9786899-3-3
