= Hasty Pudding Theatricals =

Student theatrical society at Harvard

Coordinates: 42°22′21.2″N 71°7′5.2″W

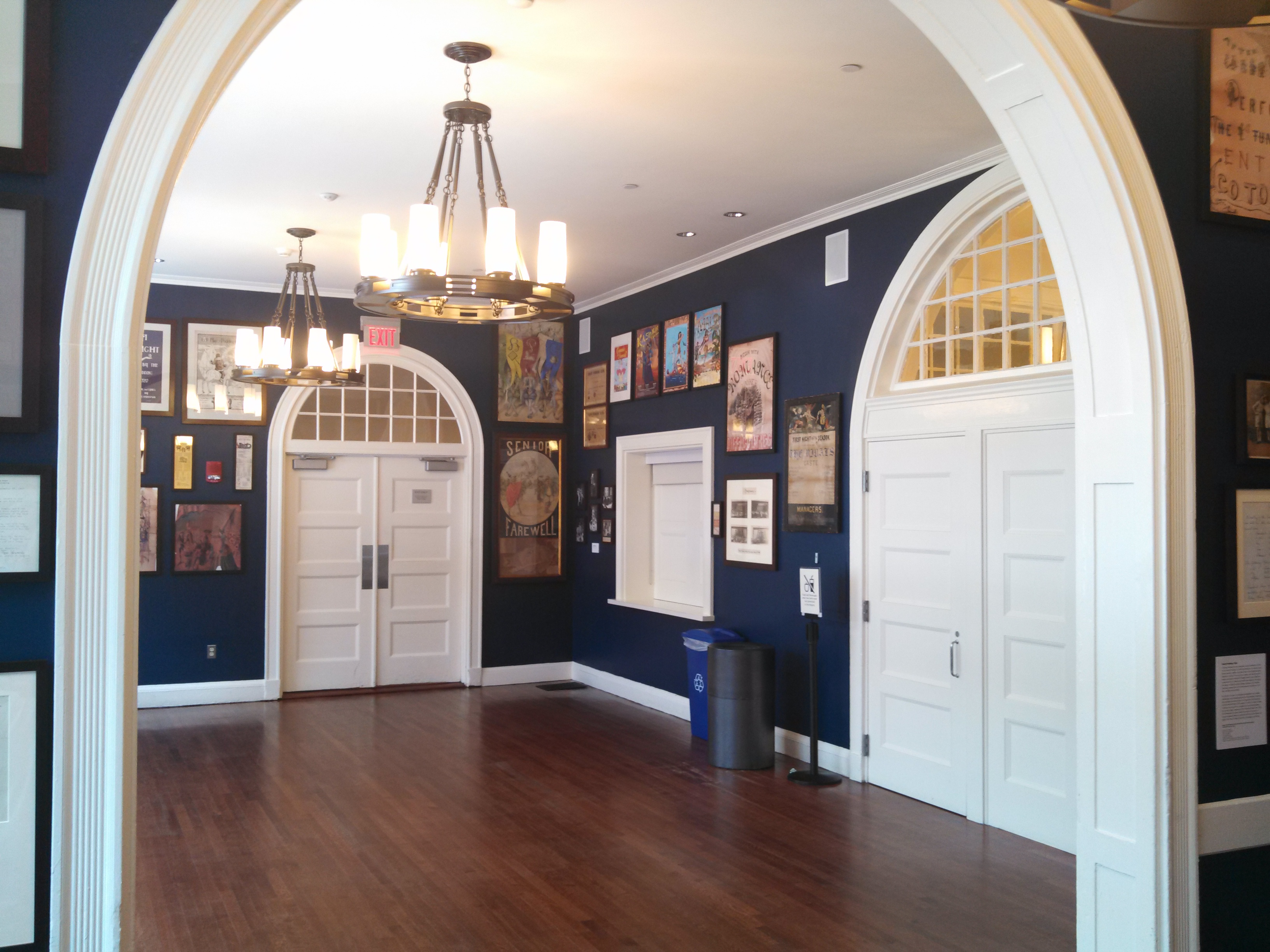
The Hasty Pudding lobby

Hasty Pudding Theatricals is a student theatrical society at Harvard University known for its annual burlesque crossdressing musicals as well as its Man and Woman of the Year awards. The Pudding is the oldest theatrical organization in the United States and the third oldest in the world. Its annual production is a musical comedy that often touches on topical social and political issues.

== History ==
Hasty Pudding Theatricals was formed in 1795 as a social club for Harvard College students to cultivate the social affections and cherish the feelings of friendship and patriotism. On December 13, 1844, the Pudding put on its first full performance – William Barnes Rhodes' burlesque opera Bombastes Furioso. After a period of producing popular comedies by established playwrights, student members of the Pudding began to write their own shows, starting in 1882 with a production of Dido and Aeneas by Owen Wister. The event was interrupted for 2 years during each of the World Wars and once more in 2020 due to the COVID-19 pandemic.

The cast was limited to only men (often performing in drag) until 2018, though women played a role in the company for many years, primarily as costumers. In 1948 Felisa Vanoff became Pudding's first female choreographer, and in 1978 Diane Nabatoff became its first female producer. In 2009 Megan Amram and Alexandra Petri became the first all-female team to write the musical comedy. The technical crew, band, and business staff has been co-ed for many years.

== Notable alumni ==
- BJ Averell, Grand Prize winner, The Amazing Race
- Megan Amram, writer, producer, and performer
- Paris Barclay, Emmy-winning director and producer for dozens of film and television projects including NYPD Blue, Sons of Anarchy and Glee, and in 2013 was elected President of the Directors Guild of America
- Nell Benjamin, who herself wrote the award-winning play The Explorers Club
- John Berman, news anchor for CNN
- Andy Borowitz, humorist
- Josh Brener, actor in Silicon Valley, Maron, and The Big Bang Theory, and former Pudding President
- Francis Cabot, American financier, gardener and horticulturist
- Henry Ives Cobb Jr., artist
- Edward Everett, politician and orator at Gettysburg
- Fred Gwynne, actor
- William Randolph Hearst, newspaper publisher
- Rashida Jones, actress in Parks and Recreation, The Office, Boston Public, and the film I Love You, Man
- Oliver Wendell Holmes Sr., physician, poet, and polymath
- David Javerbaum, playwright who has won 13 Emmy Awards, including 11 as head writer for The Daily Show
- Jack Lemmon, Oscar winner
- Alan Jay Lerner lyricist and librettist notable for collaboration with Frederick Loewe
- J. P. Morgan Jr., financier
- Dean Norris, actor in Breaking Bad and Under the Dome
- Mark O'Donnell, librettist who won a Tony Award in 2003 for co-authoring the book for Hairspray
- Michael O'Hare, actor
- Laurence O'Keefe, actor and composer, wrote the music and lyrics for the Off-Broadway shows Bat Boy: The Musical and Heathers: The Musical
- Mark O'Keefe, co-wrote and co-produced the movies Bruce Almighty and Click
- Alexandra Petri, humorist
- Joe Raposo, composer, songwriter, pianist; for stage, screen, television Sesame Street etc.
- Mo Rocca, comedian and former Pudding librettist and president
- Franklin Delano Roosevelt, US President
- Theodore Roosevelt, US President
- Felisa Vanoff (1925–2014), who became the company's first female choreographer in 1948 (although women had been included as costumers for many years prior)
- William Weld, former Governor of Massachusetts
- Fairfax Henry Wheelan, American businessman, philanthropist, and political reformer.
- Owen Wister, novelist and biographer

== Origins of name ==
The Hasty Pudding name comes from a colonial era (originally British) dish called hasty pudding, a kind of porridge made from cornmeal with molasses, honey or other ingredients. It is not clear whether the dish was originally a staple or a dessert, but it is now served for dessert at the banquets thrown by the Pudding, such as opening night celebrations and the annual "roasts" for their Man and Woman of the Year.

== Honorary awards ==
The society is notable for their annual selection of famous entertainers as Woman of the Year since 1951 and Man of the Year since 1967. These awards are usually treated with great seriousness by the honorees. Since the unanticipated personal appearance of Jane Fonda to accept her award in 1961, the honorees always attend the awards ceremony, and are treated to a celebratory "roast", and a parade.

== Symbols ==
The Hasty Pudding Theatricals has adopted many symbols. It has two official logos: the first is a sphinx holding a pudding pot, and the second is a pudding pot depicted hanging over a fire. Its main colors are deep blue, crimson, green and yellow. The shade of yellow used by the club is an ode to the color of traditional hasty pudding. The Hasty Pudding Theatricals, Hasty Pudding Club, and Harvard Krokodiloes are all organizations of the Hasty Pudding Institute of 1770 and share the same meeting space and social events on Harvard's campus.

Concordia Discors is the official motto of the Hasty Pudding, literally meaning: Discordant Harmony, or organized chaos, in English.
