= Catharine Sargent Huntington =

American Actress

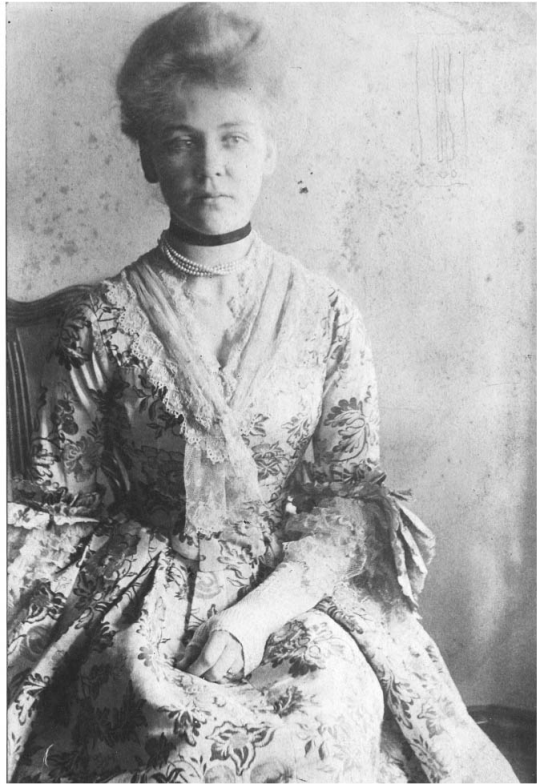
- Huntington in her great great great Grandmother Elizabeth Pitkin's wedding dress, c. 1910
- Born: Catharine Sargent Huntington; December 29, 1887; Ashfield, Massachusetts, U.S.
- Died: March 3, 1987 (aged 99); Sherrill House, Boston, Massachusetts, U.S.
- Occupations: Actress, producer, director, activist, theater company founder and manager

Catharine Sargent Huntington (1887-1987) was an American actress, producer, director, activist, and founder and manager of theater companies in the Boston, Massachusetts area. Her theatrical career spanned six decades, lasting until she was 86. In 1965, she was recognized with the Rodgers and Hammerstein Award. Additionally, Huntington was part of the "Death Watch," protesting the trials and death sentence of Sacco and Vanzetti.

== Early life and education ==
Huntington was born in Ashfield, Massachusetts on December 29, 1887, as the sole daughter of Lilly St. Agnam Barrett Huntington and clergyman George Putnam Huntington to survive infancy. The family later moved to Hanover, New Hampshire, where Huntington grew up. Between 1904 and 1906, she lived in Cedar Square, Roxbury, Boston with her aunt Kate Summer. While in Boston, Huntington attended Miss Haskell's School, graduating in 1906. She proceeded to Radcliffe College, where she graduated in 1911 cum laude with an A.B. After graduation, Huntington spent her summer in Europe and began teaching at the Westover School in Middlebury, Connecticut, where she worked until 1917.

== Activism and war involvement ==
At the beginning of World War I, Huntington left her job at Westover School to serve as the Radcliffe College representative to the troops in France with the Wellesley unit of the YMCA. She served as an aide, working on war reconstruction with the Réconstruction Aisne Devastée and the Union des Femmes de France until her return to the United States in 1920. After her return, Huntington continued local war reconstruction efforts. In August 1927, she was arrested for protesting the murder conviction and death penalty of Sacco and Vanzetti through loitering and sauntering with the "Death Watch." She was one of 156 people arrested for the protests, although her fine of $10 was double the amount of the fine for the majority of the other members of the watch. She appealed the fine and went to trial in December of the same year with seven others, including Edna St. Vincent Millay, Powers Hapgood, and John Dos Passos. She was included in the Boston Globe on August 24, 1927, in an article titled "Death Watch" To Make Test Case, that stated "Miss Huntington, whose address is 66 Pickney St, said her family had been here for 300 years and read a statement maintaining she had a right to protest as she did."

== Theater career ==
Huntington founded the Boston Stage Society in 1922, and was associated with the Brattle Theatre, Peabody Playhouse, the Tributary Theater, and the Poet's Theater throughout her lifetime. Additionally, she founded the New England Repertory Theater on Joy Street in Boston in 1938, and later founded the Provincetown Playhouse on the wharf in Cape Cod in 1940 with Edwin Pettit and Virginia Thoms. The new playhouse replaced the old structure that existed between 1915 and 1924. She served as the owner and manager of the playhouse between its founding year and 1973. During her time there, a Eugene O'Neill drama was produced each summer season, and the theater hosted the O'Neill Festival in 1966, where 10 of his plays were produced. Huntington was awarded the Rodgers and Hammerstein Award in 1965 for her work in American theater in the Boston area. Later, on her 97th birthday, Governor Michael Dukakis and the Massachusetts legislature recognized her contributions to American theater.
