= Amelia Muir Baldwin =

American interior decorator (1876–1960)

- Born: December 25, 1876; Boston, Massachusetts, US
- Died: October 31, 1960 (aged 83)
- Occupations: interior decorator needle tapestry designer
- Parent(s): Loammi Austin Baldwin and Louise Vernon (Maynard) Baldwin

Amelia Muir Baldwin (December 25, 1876 – October 31, 1960) was an American interior decorator who earned a nationwide reputation for her tapestry needlework design. From 1913 to 1919 she designed and decorated booths for Boston suffrage bazaars. She is best known for running an interior design and needle tapestry business in Boston, Massachusetts in the early 20th century and as well as her association with the Women's Suffrage Movement at the time.

Baldwin died on October 31, 1960, at her home in Boston.
