= Steven Florio =

- Born: Steven T. Florio; April 19, 1949; Queens, New York, US
- Died: December 27, 2007 (aged 58); New York, US
- Education: New York University
- Occupation(s): CEO and President of Conde Nast Publications and The New Yorker, publisher of GQ
- Spouse: Mariann Florio
- Children: Steven Florio, Kelly Kasouf
- Relatives: Tom Florio (brother)

Steven T. "Steve" Florio (April 19, 1949 – December 27, 2007) was an American magazine publisher and conglomerateur, was CEO and President of both Conde Nast Publications and The New Yorker, as well as publisher of GQ.

Born in Queens, New York, Florio graduated from New York University with a business degree in 1972.

In the 1980s he served as publisher of GQ; later he went to work at The New Yorker. He was named as President of Conde Nast in 1994 by owner Si Newhouse, and CEO two years later. He stayed as President/CEO until January 2004, but remained on contract as vice chairman for three more years.

Under Florio's tenure, Conde Nast comprised Vogue, Vanity Fair, and The New Yorker, in addition to a dozen or so other titles, specializing in demographic niches.

== Death ==
Florio, who had a history of heart disease, died Thursday, December 27, 2007, aged 58, at New York Presbyterian Hospital of complications from an earlier heart attack.
