= Radcliffe College =

Women's college in Cambridge, Massachusetts (1878–1999)

- Type: Private liberal arts college Women's college
- Active: 1879; 147 years ago–1999; 27 years ago (became Radcliffe Institute for Advanced Study)
- President: Mary Maples Dunn
- Dean: Lizabeth Cohen
- Location: Cambridge, Massachusetts, U.S. 42°22′55″N 71°7′29″W
- Campus: Urban
- Website: radcliffe.edu

Radcliffe College was a women's liberal arts college in Cambridge, Massachusetts, that was founded in 1879. The college was named for the early Harvard benefactor Anne Mowlson (née Radcliffe) and was one of the Seven Sisters colleges. In 1999, it was merged into Harvard University.

For the first 70 years of its existence, Radcliffe conferred undergraduate and graduate degrees. Beginning in 1963, it awarded joint Harvard-Radcliffe diplomas to undergraduates. In 1977, Radcliffe signed a formal "non-merger merger" agreement with Harvard University, and completed a full integration with Harvard in 1999.

Radcliffe's former administrative campus, Radcliffe Yard, has become home to the later-founded Radcliffe Institute for Advanced Study, following the 1999 merger. Former Radcliffe housing at the Radcliffe Quadrangle, including Pforzheimer House, Cabot House, and Currier House, has been incorporated into Harvard College's house system. Under the terms of the 1999 consolidation, Radcliffe Yard and the Radcliffe Quadrangle retain the "Radcliffe" designation in perpetuity.

== History ==
=== 19th century ===
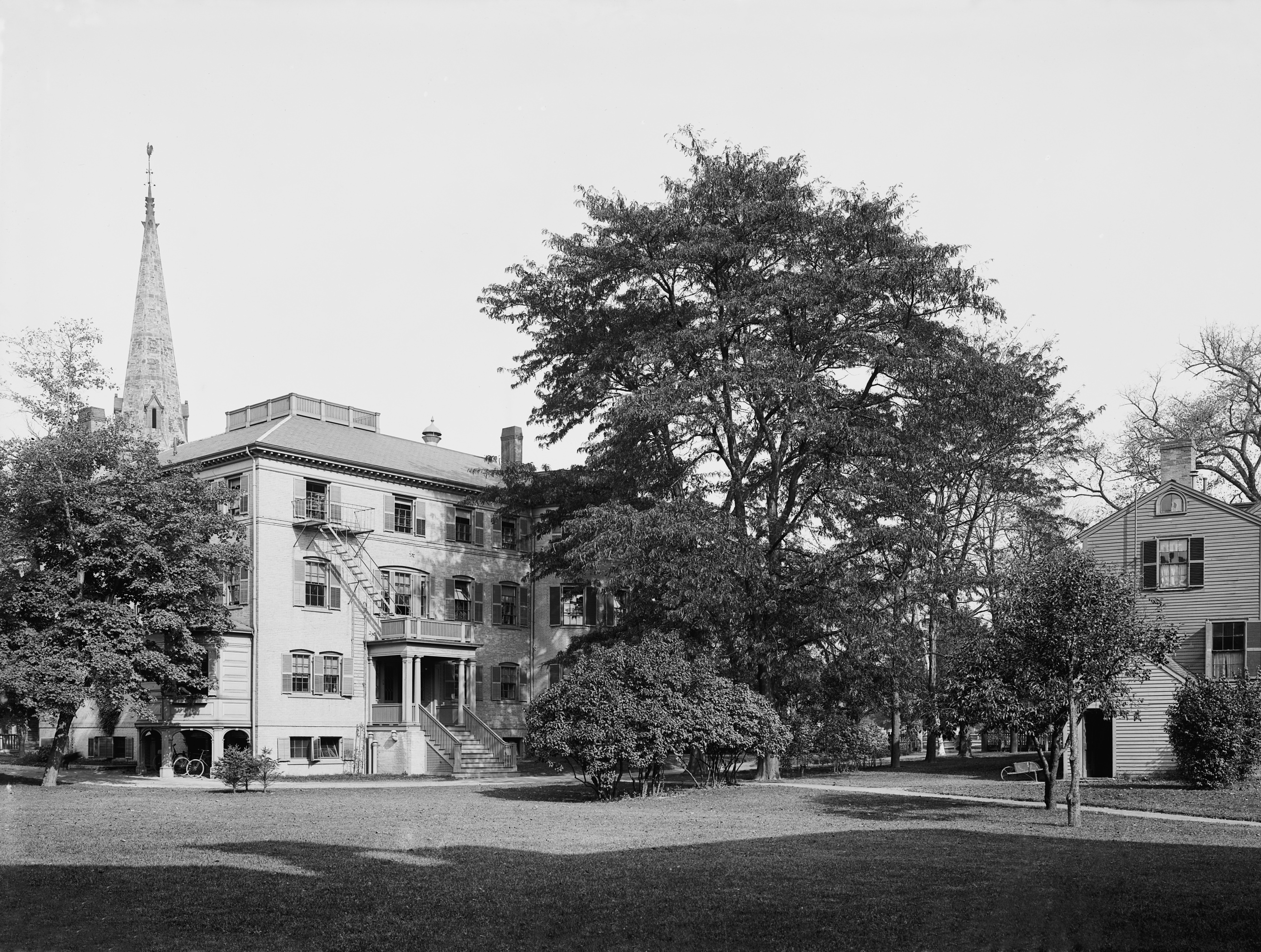
Fay House, one of the college's first buildings, and the gymnasium in c. 1904

The "Harvard Annex", a private program for the instruction of women by Harvard faculty, was founded in 1879 after prolonged efforts by women to gain access to Harvard College. Arthur Gilman, a Cambridge resident, banker, philanthropist, anthropologist, and writer, was the founder of what became The Annex/Radcliffe. At a time when higher education for women was a sharply controversial topic, Gilman hoped to establish a higher educational opportunity for his daughter that exceeded what was generally available in female seminaries and the new women's colleges such as Vassar and Wellesley. These schools were in their early years and had substantial numbers of faculty who were not university trained.

In conversations with the chair of Harvard College's classics department, Gilman outlined a plan to have Harvard faculty deliver instruction to a small group of Cambridge and Boston women. He approached Harvard president Charles William Eliot with the idea, and Eliot approved. Gilman and Eliot recruited a group of prominent and well-connected Cambridge women to manage the plan. These women were Elizabeth Cary Agassiz, Mary H. Cooke, Stella Scott Gilman, Mary B. Greenough, Ellen Hooper Gurney, Alice Mary Longfellow, and Lillian Horsford.

Building upon Gilman's premise, the committee convinced 44 members of the Harvard faculty to consider giving lectures to female students in exchange for extra income paid by the committee. The program came to be known informally as "The Harvard Annex". The course of study for the first year included 51 courses in 13 subject areas, an "impressive curriculum with greater diversity than that of any other women's college at its inception. Courses were offered in Greek, Latin, English, German, French, Italian, and Spanish; philosophy, political economy, history, music, mathematics, physics, and natural history." The first graduation ceremonies took place in the library of Longfellow House on Brattle Street, just above where George Washington's generals had slept a century earlier.

The committee members hoped that by raising an endowment for The Annex, they could persuade Harvard to admit women directly into Harvard College, but the university resisted. In his 1869 inaugural address as president of Harvard, Charles Eliot summed up the official Harvard position toward female students when he said,

The world knows next to nothing about the capacities of the female sex. Only after generations of civil freedom and social equality will it be possible to obtain the data necessary for an adequate discussion of woman's natural tendencies, tastes, and capabilities ... It is not the business of the University to decide this mooted point.

==== Harvard Examinations for Women ====
From 1874 to 1881, Harvard administered the Harvard Examinations for Women to increase women's educational opportunities, after being pressured by the Women's Education Association of Boston. During these seven years, 107 women participated; 36 received certificates. The low number of certificates received by women led Harvard to change the exam in 1881. At the time, women could also be admitted into the "Harvard Annex", the women's version of a college education. The "Harvard Examinations for Women" included subjects such as history; literature of Shakespeare and Chaucer; languages such as Latin, French, and German; botany; and mathematics. These tests were similar to the admittance exam given to men applying to Harvard College. When a woman passed a subject, she would receive a signed certificate from Harvard's president acknowledging her passing mark.

The Harvard Examinations for Women were ended two years after "Harvard Annex" officially became Radcliffe College, the women's equivalent to Harvard College.

When confronted in 1883 with the notion of females receiving Harvard degrees, the university's treasurer stated, "I have no prejudice in the matter of education of women and am quite willing to see Yale or Columbia take any risks they like, but I feel bound to protect Harvard College from what seems to me a risky experiment."

In 1888, Harvard President Eliot communicated to a faculty member he intended to hire, that "There is no obligation to teach at The Annex. Those professors who on general grounds take an interest in the education of women...feel some obligation but there are many professors who think it their duty NOT to teach there, in which opinion some of the Corporation and Overseers agree."

Eliot was strongly against co-education, saying, "The difficulties involved in a common residence of hundreds of young men and women of immature character and marriageable age are very grave. The necessary police regulations are exceedingly burdensome."

In December 1893, The Boston Globe reported, "President of Harvard To Sign Parchments of the Fair Graduates". Students seeking admission to the new women's college were required to sit for the same entrance examinations required of Harvard College students.

The committee persevered despite Eliot's skepticism. The project proved to be a success, attracting a growing number of students. As a result, the Annex was incorporated in 1882 as the Society for the Collegiate Instruction of Women, with Elizabeth Cary Agassiz, widow of Harvard professor Louis Agassiz, as president. This society awarded certificates to students but did not have the power to confer academic degrees.

In subsequent years, ongoing discussions with Harvard about admitting women directly into the university still came to a dead end. Instead, Harvard and the Annex negotiated the creation of a degree-granting institution, with Harvard professors serving as its faculty and visiting body. This modification of the Annex was chartered by the Commonwealth of Massachusetts as Radcliffe College in 1894.

By 1896, the Globe could headline a story: "Sweet Girls. They Graduate in Shoals at Radcliffe. Commencement Exercises at Sanders Theatre. Galleries Filled with Fair Friends and Students. Handsome Mrs. Agassiz Made Fine Address. Pres Eliot Commends the Work of the New Institution." The Globe said, "Eliot stated that the percentage of graduates with distinction is much higher at Radcliffe than at Harvard" and that although "[i]t is to yet to be seen whether the women have the originality and pioneering spirit which will fit them to be leaders, perhaps they will when they have had as many generations of thorough education as men."

=== 20th century ===
In 1904, historian Mary Caroline Crawford wrote the following about the founding and early days of Radcliffe College:

... it set up housekeeping in two unpretending rooms in the Appian Way, Cambridge....Probably in all the history of colleges in America there could not be found a story so full of color and interest as that of the beginning of this woman's college. The bathroom of the little house was pressed into service as a laboratory for physics, students and instructors alike making the best of all inconveniences. Because the institution was housed with a private family, generous mothering was given to the girls when they needed it.

In the first two decades of the 20th century, Radcliffe championed the beginnings of its own campus, consisting of the Radcliffe Yard and the Radcliffe Quadrangle in Cambridge, Massachusetts, not far from Harvard University. The original Radcliffe gymnasium and library, and the Bertram, Whitman, Eliot, and Barnard dormitories were constructed during this period. In the 1920s and 1930s, dormitories Briggs Hall (1924) and Cabot Hall (1937) were built on the Quadrangle, and in the Radcliffe Yard, the administrative building Byerly Hall (1932) and the classroom building Longfellow Hall (1930). Mary Almy was the architect.

English professor Barrett Wendell warned his colleagues about continued cooperation with Radcliffe, saying that Harvard could "suddenly find itself committed to coeducation somewhat as unwary men lay themselves open to actions for breach of promise." In Wendell's view, Harvard needed to remain "purely virile".

In 1923, Ada Comstock, a leader in the movement to provide women with higher education, who hailed from the University of Minnesota and Smith College, became the college's third president. She was a key figure in the college's early 20th-century development. Speaking of her, one alumna remembers that "we were in awe of 'Miss Comstock ... and knew even then that we had been touched by a vanishing breed of female educator. Ada Comstock had an extraordinary presence—she radiated dignity, strength, and decisiveness." In the early 1940s, she negotiated a new relationship with Harvard that vastly expanded women's access to the full Harvard course catalog.

==== Growth ====
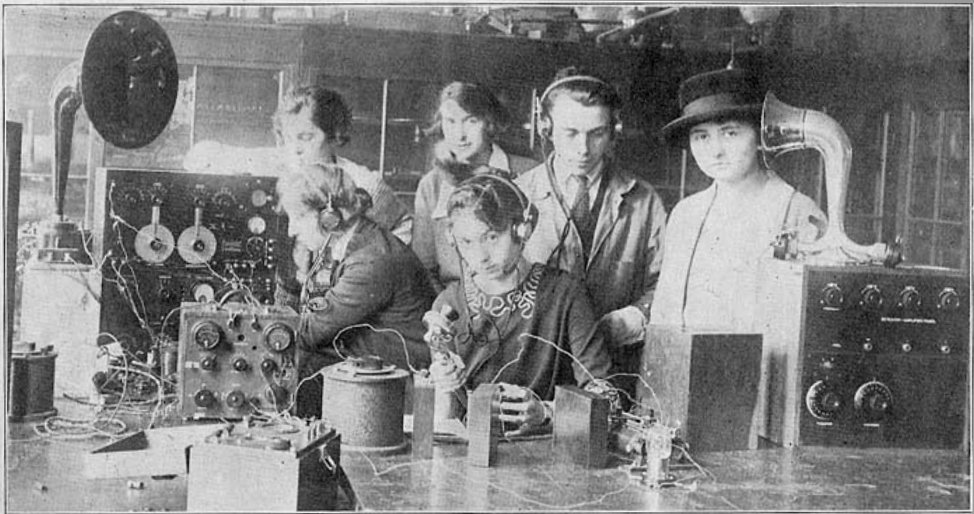
A radio science class at Radcliffe College in 1922

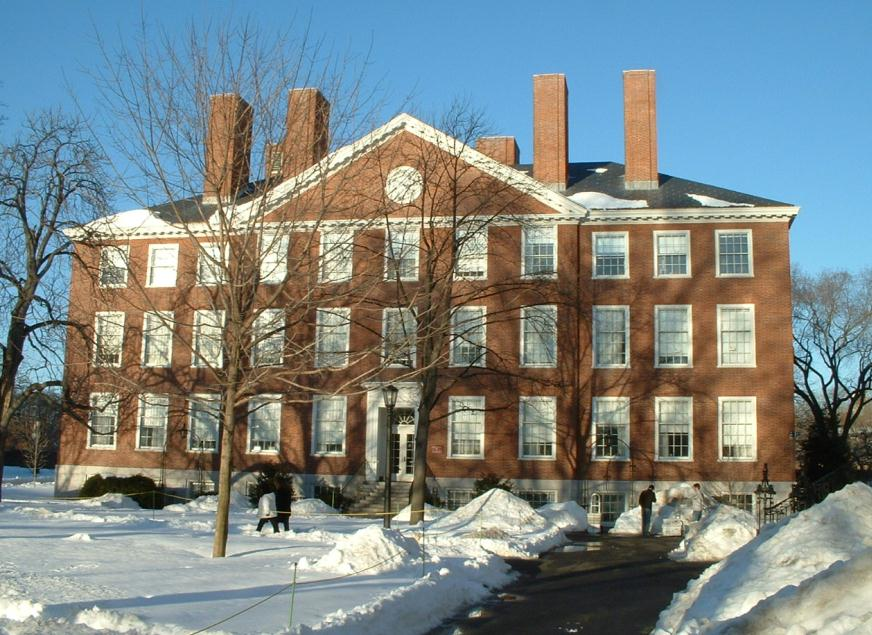
Byerly Hall, built in 1932

David McCord set the college apart from the other Seven Sisters institutions, saying "there is one respect in which Radcliffe differs from her sisters, and this should be made clear. Although she divides with Barnard, Bryn Mawr, and Wellesley all advantages of a large city, and enjoys the further privilege of being front-fence neighbor to Harvard University, Radcliffe alone has had from the first the strength of a university faculty....Thus, from the beginning, Radcliffe has been a woman's Harvard. It is still a separate institution, with its own corporation, receiving from Harvard no financial aid." Because it had a university – as opposed to "collegiate" – faculty, Radcliffe was unique among the Seven Sisters in being able to provide a graduate program with a wide number of opportunities for students to pursue advanced studies.

M. Carey Thomas, the second president and chief visionary of Bryn Mawr College, lobbied against the conversion of the Society for the Collegiate Instruction of Women into Radcliffe College precisely because the Cambridge rival's access to a university faculty competed with Bryn Mawr's own academic ambitions. Between 1890 and 1963, Radcliffe awarded more than 750 PhDs and more than 3000 master's degrees to women. During the 1950s, the school conferred more PhDs to women than any school other than Columbia and the University of Chicago. In 1955–56, the college produced more female PhDs than any other institution in the United States.

Because Radcliffe's faculty was Harvard's, in the college's first 50 years, professors from Harvard, each under individual contracts with the Radcliffe administration duplicated lectures, providing them first for men in the Harvard Yard and then crossing the Cambridge Common to provide the same lectures to women in the Radcliffe Yard. Professor Elwood Byerly wrote that he "always found the spirit, industry, and ability of the girls admirable—indeed, the average has been higher in my mathematics classes in the Annex than in my classes at the college."

In March 1915, The New York Times reported that all of the prizes offered in a playwriting competition at Harvard and Radcliffe that year were won by Radcliffe students. One of the Harvard contributions received honorable mention.

In the early 1960s, the newspaper also reported that "taking the same courses and exams as Harvard, 60 percent of Radcliffe's girls were on the Dean's List as compared with 42 percent of Harvard men."

Dorothy Howells noted that, "Allegations were made that Radcliffe was a 'vampire' and a 'temptress' enticing the teacher from his career-advancing research and publication with the lure of additional income."

Ruth Hubbard, a member of the Harvard faculty from 1974 to 1990 and a member of the Radcliffe class of 1944, noted that "the senior [Harvard] professors were less than thrilled to have to repeat their lectures at Radcliffe. The lower rank faculty members, who were sometimes detailed off to teach the introductory science courses at Radcliffe instead of teaching Harvard students, felt even more declasse."

Marion Cannon Schlesinger, Radcliffe Class of 1934, noted that "there were, to be sure, certain professors who looked with horror at the incursions of women into the sacred precincts of Harvard College, even at the safe distance of the Radcliffe Yard, and would have nothing to do with the academic arrangements by which their colleagues taught the Radcliffe girls. Professor Roger Merriman, for example, the first master of Eliot House and a professor of history, would not have been caught dead teaching a Radcliffe class."

During World War II, declines in male enrollment at Harvard and heightened sensitivity about the use of resources called for a new, more efficient arrangement concerning faculty time. Under the leadership of President Comstock, Radcliffe and Harvard signed an agreement that for the first time allowed Radcliffe and Harvard students to attend the same classes in the Harvard Yard, officially beginning joint instruction in 1943. Equally significant, the agreement ended the era in which individual faculty members at Harvard could choose whether to enter contracts with Radcliffe.

The agreement instead opened the entire Harvard catalogue to Radcliffe students, in exchange for which Radcliffe made a payment to Harvard of a fixed portion of Radcliffe tuitions. President Comstock noted that the agreement was "the most significant event since our charter was granted in 1894." All Harvard faculty, whether interested or not, had a legal obligation to teach Radcliffe students. In practice a few holdouts on the Harvard faculty maneuvered around this obligation by announcing that their classes had "limited enrollment" and then limiting enrollment solely to male students. At the time, both Harvard and Radcliffe were adamant in telling the press that this arrangement was "joint instruction" but not "coeducation". Reacting to the agreement, Harvard president James Bryant Conant said, "Harvard was not coeducational in theory, only in practice." Indeed, Radcliffe continued to maintain a separate admissions office which, by general acknowledgment, was more stringent in its academic requirements of applicants than Harvard's. Most extra-curricular activities at the two colleges remained separate.

Following World War II, Radcliffe negotiated a higher ceiling on its student enrollment. This success was orchestrated in tandem with additional housing construction. Moors Hall was completed in 1949, Holmes Hall in 1952, the Cronkhite Graduate Center in 1956, and Comstock Hall in 1958. The added dormitory space and national recruiting campaigns led to an increasingly national and international student body.

In 1961, the Jordan Cooperative Houses, an option for students to engage in more communal living, with student responsibility for shopping for food, preparing meals and housekeeping, were built, and the college purchased Wolbach Hall, an apartment building also known as 124 Walker Street, in 1964. Radcliffe constructed Hilles Library in 1966 and the Radcliffe Quadrangle Athletic Center in 1982.

Also in 1961, then President Mary Bunting reorganized the autonomous Radcliffe dormitories into "houses," mirroring Harvard's houses and Yale University's residential colleges.

The three houses (North, South, and East) were eventually consolidated into two (North and South). In 1970, the college completed construction of Currier House, the first Radcliffe House designed with the "House Plan" in mind. South House eventually was renamed Cabot House in 1984 while North House became Pforzheimer House in 1995.

Bunting felt that the house system would give Radcliffe students an intellectual community comparable to what Harvard students were getting, bringing together faculty and students in a way the free-standing Radcliffe dormitories did not, and allowing all to see with greater clarity the aspirations, capabilities, and interests of undergraduate women. Speaking generally about her philosophy for Radcliffe, President Bunting noted that "part of our special purpose is to convey to our students and through them to others that there is no basic conflict between being intellectual and being feminine."

Bunting also established the Radcliffe Institute in 1961. The institute – a precursor to the current Radcliffe Institute for Advanced Study – gave financial support, access to research libraries and facilities, and recognition to scholarly women who had taken time away from intellectual pursuits to focus on home and family. In providing women with a venue to return to academia, Bunting was recognizing that traditional academic institutions were premised on a male life trajectory where a scholar's domestic concerns were taken care of by someone else (usually a wife).

The Radcliffe Institute, later renamed the Bunting Institute, was an institution premised on the needs of a female life trajectory, providing opportunities that might otherwise have been truncated by women's decisions during early adulthood to leave academia to raise children.

In the 1930s, Harvard president A. Lawrence Lowell took a dim view of Radcliffe, maintaining that the time Harvard professors spent providing lectures to women distracted the faculty from their scholarship, and providing Radcliffe women access to research facilities and Harvard museums was – in his view – an unnecessary burden on the university's resources. He threatened to scuttle the relationship between the two institutions. Radcliffe was forced to agree to a limitation on the size of its student body, with 750 spaces for undergraduates and 250 for graduate students.

A ceiling on enrollment of women when compared to the enrollment of men was renegotiated upward at various points throughout the relationship with Harvard and remained constant in Radcliffe's operations until it began its ultimate incorporation into Harvard University in 1977.

== Presidents of Radcliffe College ==
The office of the president was created with the incorporation of the Society for the Collegiate Instruction of Women in 1882. The society became Radcliffe College in 1894.

The following persons have led Radcliffe College until it was absorbed by Harvard University in 1999:

No.	Image	President	Term started	Term ended	Refs.
1		Elizabeth Cary Agassiz	1882	1903	
2		LeBaron Russell Briggs (Note: part-time president of Radcliffe and the dean of Harvard’s Faculty of Arts and Sciences)	1903	1923	
3		Ada Louise Comstock	September 1, 1923	August 31, 1943	
4		Wilbur Kitchener Jordan	October 1, 1943	June 30, 1960	
5		Mary Bunting	July 1, 1960	June 30, 1972	
6		Matina Souretis Horner	July 1, 1972	June 30, 1989	
7		Linda S. Wilson	July 1, 1989	June 30, 1999	
acting		Mary Maples Dunn (Note: Dunn was acting president of Radcliffe College from July 1, 1999, to September 30, 1999, and subsequently acting dean of the Radcliffe Institute for Advanced Study from October 1, 1999, to December 31, 2000.)	July 1, 1999	September 30, 1999	

Table notes:

== Graduate and post-graduate opportunities ==
Radcliffe staff were invested in assisting women graduates with career planning and placement, as well as providing a number of different programs to provide post-graduate study for women. The Harvard-Radcliffe Program in Business Administration was begun as career training for alums interested in business. It grew to become a vehicle for women to pursue study at Harvard's Business School.

Other post-graduate courses of study at Radcliffe grew as the undergraduate women students became more a part of Harvard University. The Radcliffe Publishing Course offered students experience in editing and other skills needed to enter the field of publishing. The Radcliffe Seminars Program in Landscape Design gave students a chance to study landscape design before it was a course of study at the Harvard Design School, and in a less formal environment.

Radcliffe first granted PhDs starting in 1902. Between 1894 and 1902, multiple students completed all course and thesis requirements for a PhD degree in the department of zoology, working in the Radcliffe Zoological Laboratory, without receiving the title.

== Student life and notable extracurricular activities ==
Beyond the life of the mind, another appeal of Radcliffe was the comparative freedom that its undergraduates enjoyed compared to students at other women's colleges. Cambridge and Boston provided diversions that were denied to women at more geographically isolated institutions. In his history of the college, David McCord noted that "the music, theaters and museums were surprisingly close." While students at many women's colleges only had social interactions with men on weekends, Radcliffe students saw men in town and, after 1943, in classes and laboratories on a daily basis while still having their own institution, student organizations and activities, and space. In the 1950s, an era of "in loco parentis" at many postsecondary institutions, it was common at women's colleges for housemothers to keep diligent watch of the time when women returned to their dorms, locking the doors when check-in hour had arrived and punishing women who missed their check-in times. Radcliffe students, by contrast, had their own dormitory keys and filled out sign-in sheets when they arrived in the evening. Their lives were not as cloistered as those of some of their counterparts at the sister schools, and according to an article in Mademoiselle Magazine, "it was the richness and freedom of life at Radcliffe" which left its mark on the student body. One graduate of the class of 1934 noted, "We were getting the best education in the country, and besides, we weren't banished to the sticks to rusticate. Weekends at Yale and Princeton may have been the answer to a maiden's prayer at Vassar, but we did not have to wait for ceremonial weekends for our entertainment: there were those among the Harvard population who recognized our "merits." A student from the early 1960s picked up on this theme, contrasting the Radcliffe experience with that of Smith. "There are smart girls at Smith, all right," she said. "But they don't seem to get much out of them there. Four years later they don't seem to be any brighter. And they have this crazy week-end system. You spend all week in Bermuda shorts, with your hair in curlers, worrying over who's going to take you to Amherst or New Haven Friday night. It seems to me that sort of thing actually retards you in the long run." (Conversely, the greater seclusion of places such as Smith, Vassar and Mt. Holyoke sometimes made these latter institutions more attractive to socially conservative families.)

Reflecting on her time at Radcliffe, writer Alison Lurie stated that "most of the time we were in a mild state of euphoria...our lives were luxurious by modern undergraduate standards...We had private rooms, cleaned and tidied by tolerant Irish maids; a laundry called for our dirty clothes every week and returned them carefully washed and ironed; we ate off of china in our own dining room and sat in drawing rooms that resembled those of a good women's club."

"Pluck" was a quality attributed to some Radcliffe students. Beth Gutcheon of the class of 1967 wrote in a reminiscence that "One night a classmate of mine was leaving the library alone at eleven when somebody jumped her from behind and knocked her to the ground. She yelled, 'Oh, Christ, I don't have time for this. I have an exam tomorrow!' and after a disappointed pause, her attacker got up and went away."

Throughout most of the college's history, residential life and student activities at Radcliffe remained separate from those at Harvard, with separate dormitories and dining facilities (located on the Radcliffe Quadrangle), newspapers (The Radcliffe News, Percussion), radio stations (WRRB and WRAD, a.k.a. Radio Radcliffe), drama society (The Idler), student government (Radcliffe Student Government Association and later, The Radcliffe Union of Students), yearbooks, athletic programs, choral associations (The Radcliffe Choral Society, the Cliffe Clefs, and later the Radcliffe Pitches), etc. (located in the Radcliffe Yard). Radcliffe had greater diversity in housing options than Harvard, with college-owned frame houses, an apartment building, and co-operative housing for students who were not interested in immersion in dormitory life or life within the House System.

Dances were popular features of undergraduate life. "At different times there were class dances, club dances, junior and senior proms, sophomore tea dances, Christmas dances, and spring formals. Dormitory-based dances were known as 'jolly-ups.'" One particularly popular event during the 1950s was the Radcliffe Grant in Aid show, which was sponsored by the student government. The show raised money for scholarships and always ended with a student kick-line in red shorts. Perhaps because of the shorts, Harvard students were particularly drawn to the event.

The Radcliffe Choral Society was a popular and influential student group. Started in 1899 and conducted by Marie Gillison, a German-born singing teacher, the group cultivated an interest in sophisticated classical music at a time when many collegiate choral groups were devoted to college songs and more popular ditties. Archibald Davidson, who took up the reins of conducting the Choral Society after Gillison (he also conducted the Harvard Glee Club), stated, "I sometimes wonder how much, if anything, Harvard realizes that it owes to Radcliffe... Harvard...should not forget that while its Glee Club was slowly progressing toward enlightenment, Radcliffe, just across the Common, had for a long time under Mrs. Gillison's direction set an example of devotion to the best music." Davidson added that "without the early and enthusiastic cooperation of 'the young ladies of Radcliffe' the impressive tradition of college choral singing, which is now nationwide and which is always associated first with Cambridge, would almost certainly have been established much later here or would have originated elsewhere." Arranged by Mrs. Gillison, the 1917 Choral Society concert with the Harvard Glee Club and the Boston Symphony Orchestra was a footnote in music history, the first time a university chorus sang with a major orchestra. The concert became an annual tradition for many years.

The Radcliffe Crew is the oldest women's rowing program in the Ivy League. Even after the merger of Harvard and Radcliffe, the team maintains the Radcliffe name and Radcliffe colors as a sign of respect for the tradition of Radcliffe and the women who fought to establish the rowing program. The crew has a distinguished history. The team won the national championship in 1973 and thus got to represent the United States at the Eastern European Championships in Moscow. In 1974, the Eastern Association of Women's Rowing Colleges (EAWRC) was formed. In both 1974 and 1975, Radcliffe won consecutive Eastern Sprints titles. In 1987, Radcliffe's heavyweight varsity eight completed an undefeated season with a victory at Eastern Sprints and an Ivy championship title. Six of the crew's eight rowers went on to compete in the Olympic Games. In 1989, Radcliffe was also undefeated with a Sprints championship and Ivy title. The season finale was a victory in the Open Eight at the Henley Women's Regatta in England.

== Growing consolidation with Harvard ==
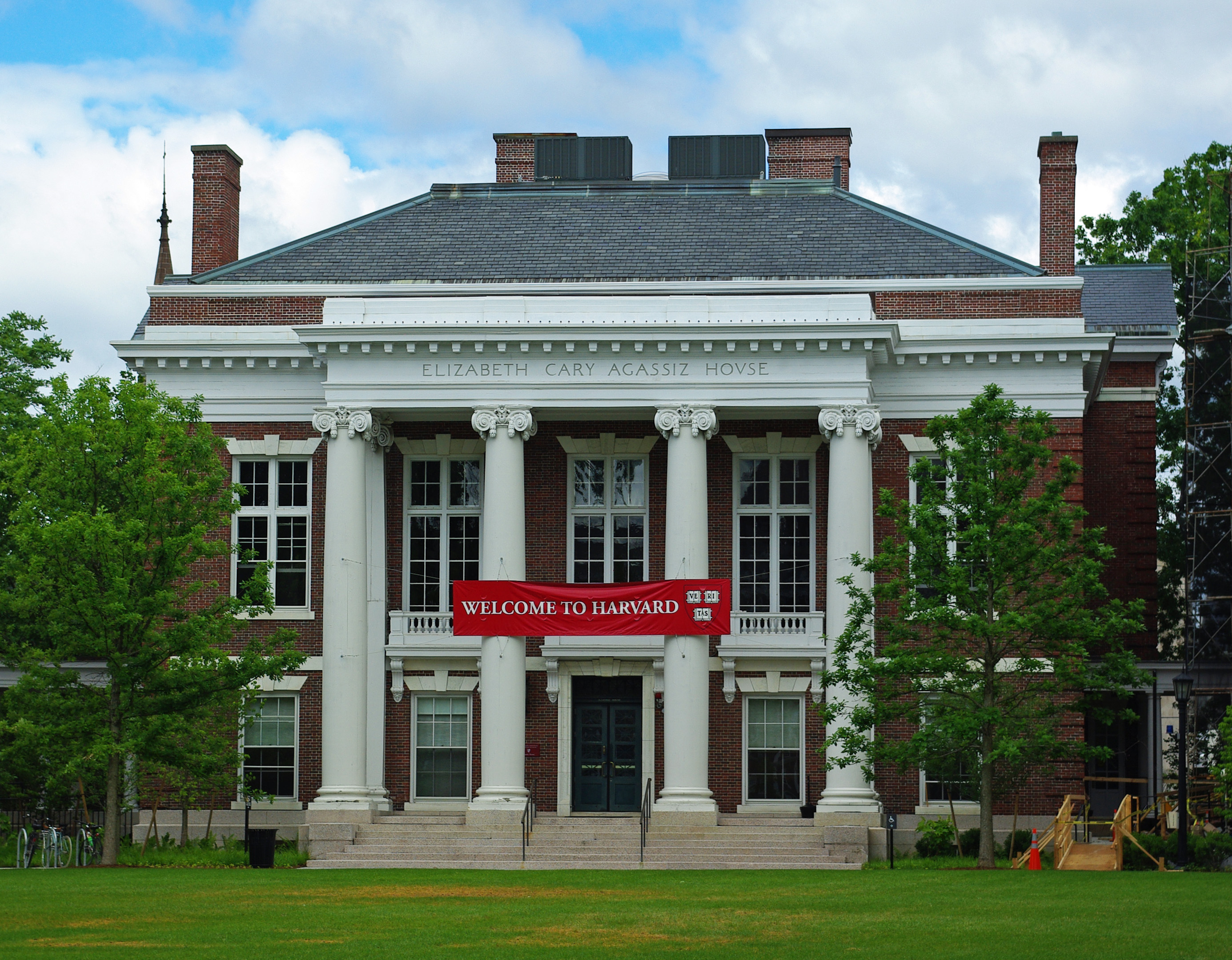
Elizabeth Cary Agassiz House, 2012

The parallel Radcliffe and Harvard student universes—with formal intersections only in the classroom—continued until the 1960s. At this point, awareness of the comparative benefits of Radcliffe vis-a-vis the other Seven Sisters was increasingly eclipsed by growing sensitivity to the disadvantages that Radcliffe students had vis-a-vis Harvard students. Harvard students lived closer to the Harvard Yard, while Radcliffe students had a longer walk to Yard-based classes from the Radcliffe Quadrangle. Harvard housing was more luxurious than Radcliffe dormitories, and much more of the schools' shared intellectual life took place on the Harvard campus. Financial aid and student prizes at Harvard were larger than those at Radcliffe, even though students from the two schools were enrolled in the same courses. By the late 1950s, the terms of the "joint instruction" agreement still imposed a ceiling on the enrollment of Radcliffe students, with Harvard males getting four times the number of spots in a freshman class that Radcliffe students got. And at the end of four years of study, students at Harvard received a diploma from Harvard while Radcliffe students taking the same courses received a diploma from Radcliffe.

These asymmetries did not bother all students, as some viewed the differences as a matter of course between two different institutions. This perspective was particularly strong with Radcliffe students who graduated before the turbulent 1960s. One alumna from the 1940s mused that at Radcliffe "we were supremely happy in our own environment. For us, Harvard remained 'the other.' Most of us felt no connection to it;...instead, we enjoyed our own collegiate activities and traditions. Another graduate from the class of 1949 noted that she was "having my cake and eating it, too. In addition to my Harvard education, I was enjoying the benefits of a small women's college. The Radcliffe Quadrangle was quiet and peaceful, life in the dormitories was friendly and gracious. ... The women who had chosen to come to Radcliffe all were intelligent, quite independent, and concerned with the world around them." Additionally, Radcliffe offered a cultural advantage over Harvard: even when enrolled in the same courses, Harvard and Radcliffe student took exams separately, as Radcliffe College's honor code necessitated a vastly different exam-taking environment: "Where the men's exam rituals included proctors, dress codes, and a strict requirement of silence, the Radcliffe women took un-proctored exams, relished the chance to wear informal pants instead of skirts, and could enter and exit the building as they wished so long as they did not cheat." Similarly, the Radcliffe honor code provided for more generous library and campus space privileges (for student groups) than the more bureaucratic Harvard systems allowed.

However, some people within the Radcliffe community were less sanguine about the differences between the two schools, seeing the relationship with Harvard as an institutionalized separate but unequal experience for women. Writer Alison Lurie reflected that "for Radcliffe students of my time the salient fact about Harvard was that it so evidently was not ours. Our position was like that of poor relations living just outside the walls of a great estate: patronized by some of our grand relatives, tolerated by others, and snubbed or avoided by the rest."

Famed poet Adrienne Rich, class of 1951, described receiving an "insidious double message" when she was at Radcliffe. Radcliffe students "were told that we were the most privileged college women in America," but "while intellectual and emotional life went on with intensity in all-female dorms, and we had our own newspaper, our own literary magazine, clubs, and student government, we knew that the real power (and money) were invested in Harvard's institutions, from which we were excluded."

Acceptance of the 19th-century rationales for this exclusion was fading, particularly as during the 1960s, a nationwide movement for co-education grew. Reflecting this movement, many Radcliffe students began to insist upon receiving Harvard diplomas for their academic work and upon merging Radcliffe and Harvard extra-curricular activities. Growing budgetary problems at Radcliffe encouraged this insistence. The Radcliffe Graduate School merged with Harvard's in 1963, and from that year onward Radcliffe undergraduates received Harvard University diplomas signed by the presidents of Radcliffe and Harvard. (Harvard students' diplomas were signed only by the president of Harvard.) Radcliffe students were fully and permanently admitted to Harvard's Lamont Library in 1967. Many Radcliffe and Harvard student groups combined during the 1960s and joint commencement exercises between the two institutions began in 1970. In 1971, largely in response to gains made by newly co-ed Princeton and Yale in their respective yields of students admitted to Harvard, Yale and Princeton, and to comparable admissions competition posed by the increasing national popularity of co-ed Stanford, Harvard president Derek Bok reduced the admissions ratio of Harvard students to Radcliffe students from 4:1 to 5:2. That same year, several Harvard and Radcliffe dormitories began swapping students through an experimental program, and in 1972 full co-residence between the two colleges was instituted. The schools' departments of athletics merged shortly thereafter.

By the late 1960s there were open discussions between Radcliffe and Harvard about complete merger of the two institutions—which in truth meant abolition of Radcliffe. However, a merger study committee of the Radcliffe Alumnae Association recommended caution. In a prepared statement, the committee reported that "it would be a mistake to dissolve Radcliffe at this time. Women's self-awareness is increasing as the 'women's liberation movement develops and as moderate groups call attention to the life styles and problems particular to women. This is precisely the wrong time to abolish a prestigious women's college which should be giving leadership to women as they seek to define and enlarge their role in society."

Instead of a complete merger, in 1977 Radcliffe president Matina Horner and Harvard president Derek Bok signed an agreement that, through their admission to Radcliffe, put undergraduate women entirely in Harvard College. The so-called "non-merger merger" combined the Radcliffe and Harvard admissions offices and ended the forced ceiling on female enrollment. In practice most of the energies of Radcliffe (which remained an autonomous institution) were then devoted to the institution's research initiatives and fellowships, rather than to female undergraduates. The Harvard and Radcliffe undergraduate communities and classes came to be known officially as "Harvard and Radcliffe" or "Harvard-Radcliffe", and female students continued to be awarded degrees signed by both presidents. Radcliffe continued to own its campus and provided financial aid, undergraduate prizes, and externship and fellowship opportunities to Radcliffe students, and the college continued to sponsor academic access programs for high school girls and continuing education opportunities for people outside the traditional college age. The college also continued to support programs and workshops targeting female undergraduates.

In practice, though, Radcliffe at this point had minimal impact on the average undergraduate's day to day experiences at the university. This minimal role fueled still more talk about a full merger of the two schools. Conversely, supporters of the "non-merger merger" maintained that the agreement gave Radcliffe students the full benefits of Harvard citizenship while allowing maintenance of the proud Radcliffe identity, an institution with its own mission, programs, financial resources and alumnae network.

On October 1, 1999, Radcliffe College was fully absorbed into Harvard University; female undergraduates were henceforward members only of Harvard College while Radcliffe College evolved into the Radcliffe Institute for Advanced Study.

== Radcliffe after the merger ==
The Radcliffe Institute for Advanced Study, now a division of Harvard University, carries on many of the research and professional development programs that Radcliffe College pioneered and has introduced other programs to the worldwide community of scholars. The end of Radcliffe's role as an undergraduate institution, however, still has its detractors. "Although I realize the merger was inevitable," a member of the class of 1959 commented, "...I nevertheless regret the loss of my college, which gave me so much. Another noted that she "feels sad that Radcliffe College no longer exists. It, far more than Harvard, defined my college experience. I can't remember a single Harvard classmate, but two of my best friends are fellow Cliffies and I exchange correspondence with about a dozen more." Indeed, many Radcliffe alumnae feel their institution has relinquished its distinguished identity in favor of a male-oriented one that remains steadfastly dismissive of women's concerns. This latter perspective gained some traction when, in a voice reminiscent of Presidents Eliot and Lowell, Harvard's early 21st-century president Lawrence Summers publicly stated that women were not as capable in the sciences as men. Additionally, shortly after full merger of the two schools, Harvard undergraduate women feeling a void in Harvard's support for women's intellectual and personal development started to lobby Harvard to create a women's center. Perhaps not surprisingly, memories of Harvard's historical indifference to women have led many Radcliffe alumnae to maintain primary ties to Radcliffe College and not to Harvard University. "Womenless history has been a Harvard specialty," Laurel Thatcher Ulrich noted. The Annex gained some vindication against Presidents Eliot, Lowell, and Summers when Drew Gilpin Faust, Dean of the Radcliffe Institute, replaced Summers and became Harvard's first female president.

Radcliffe College alumnae continue to press Harvard on the question of the university's commitment to women, and increasing the number of female faculty members at Harvard is a particular alumnae interest. Former Radcliffe president Matina Horner once told the New York Times of her surprise when she first delivered a lecture at Harvard in 1969 and four male students approached her. One of these students told her that they "just wanted to see what it felt like to be lectured by a woman and if a woman could be articulate." Picking up on the perceived common Harvard blind-eye to women's intellectual competence and reflecting on the fact that while at Radcliffe they had had very few female faculty members, in the late 1990s a group of Radcliffe alumnae established the Committee for The Equality of Women at Harvard. The group chose to boycott Harvard's fundraising campaigns and sent letters to all 27,000 Radcliffe alumnae and to 13,000 Harvard alumni asking them to shift their donations to an escrow account until the university stepped up its efforts to add women to its tenured faculty. The group has not established quotas that it wants Harvard to meet. Rather, it has stated that individual Harvard departments should measure their percentage of tenured women faculty against a "realistically available pool" and create a plan to increase the number of women if that percentage falls short. The group also said that when departments do so, the escrow account (now called the Harvard Women's Faculty Fund) will be turned over to Harvard.

In the meantime, enriched by hundreds of millions of dollars that Harvard conferred unto Radcliffe at the time of the full merger, the Radcliffe Institute today awards dozens of annual fellowships to prominent academics. Although it does not focus solely on women returning to academe, it is a major research center within Harvard University. Its Schlesinger Library is one of America's largest repositories of manuscripts and archives relating to the history of women.

Several undergraduate student organizations in Harvard College still refer to Radcliffe in their names, (for example the Radcliffe Union of Students, Harvard's feminist organization; the Radcliffe Choral Society, Harvard's female choir (now one of the Holden Choirs), which has alumnae from both Radcliffe and Harvard and maintains a repertoire of Radcliffiana; the Harvard Radcliffe Orchestra; the Harvard-Radcliffe Gilbert and Sullivan Players; the Radcliffe Pitches, a female a cappella singing group; and the Harvard-Radcliffe Dramatic Club). Two athletic teams still compete under the Radcliffe name: varsity crew, which still rows with Radcliffe's black-and-white oarblades and uniforms instead of Harvard's crimson-and-white (in 1973 the team had been the only varsity team which voted not to adopt the Harvard name); and club rugby union. In addition, the Harvard University Band still plays a Radcliffe fight song.

== Notable alumni ==
Notable Radcliffe alumni include:

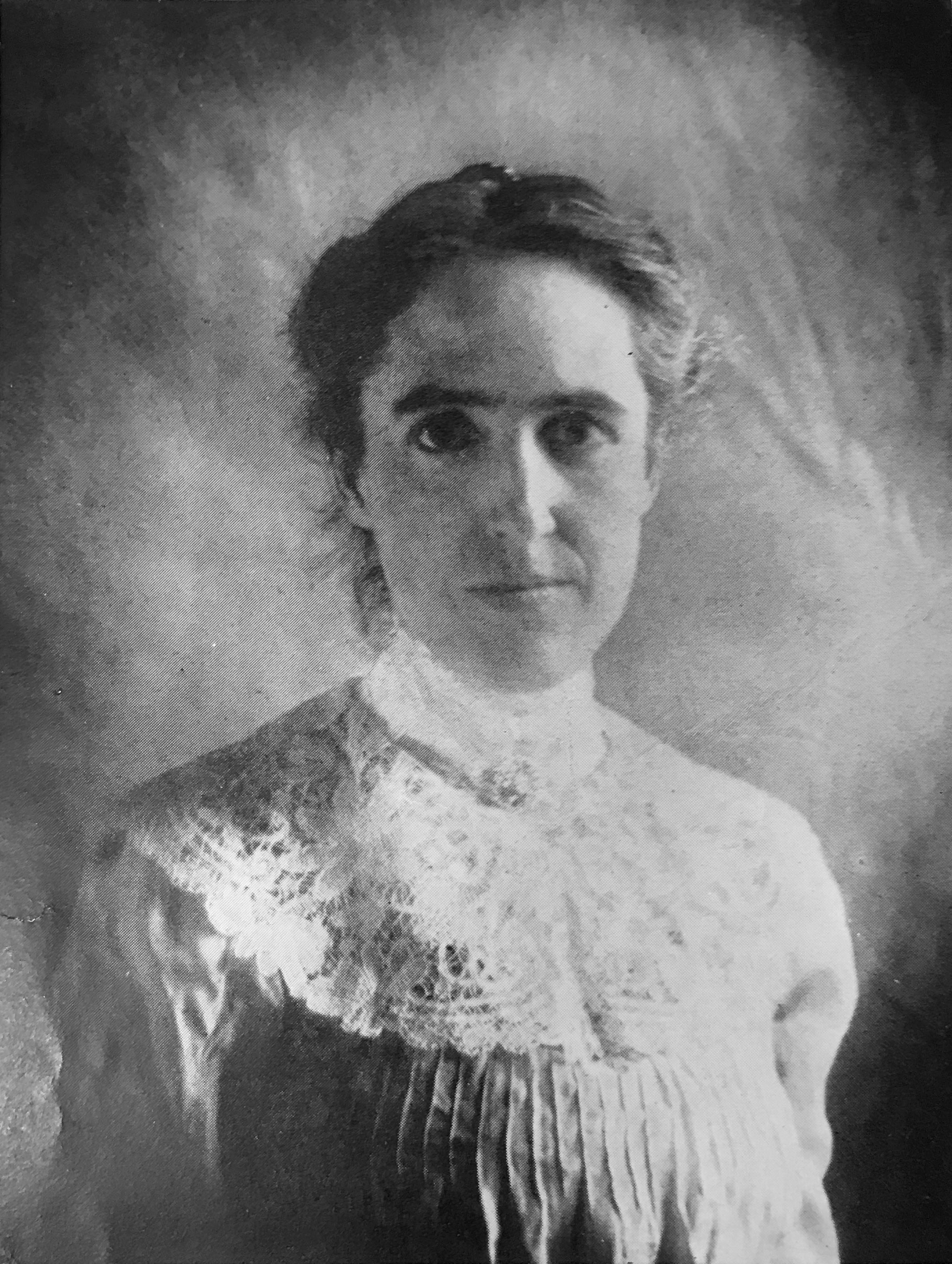
Astronomer and computer Henrietta Swan Leavitt (AB, 1892)

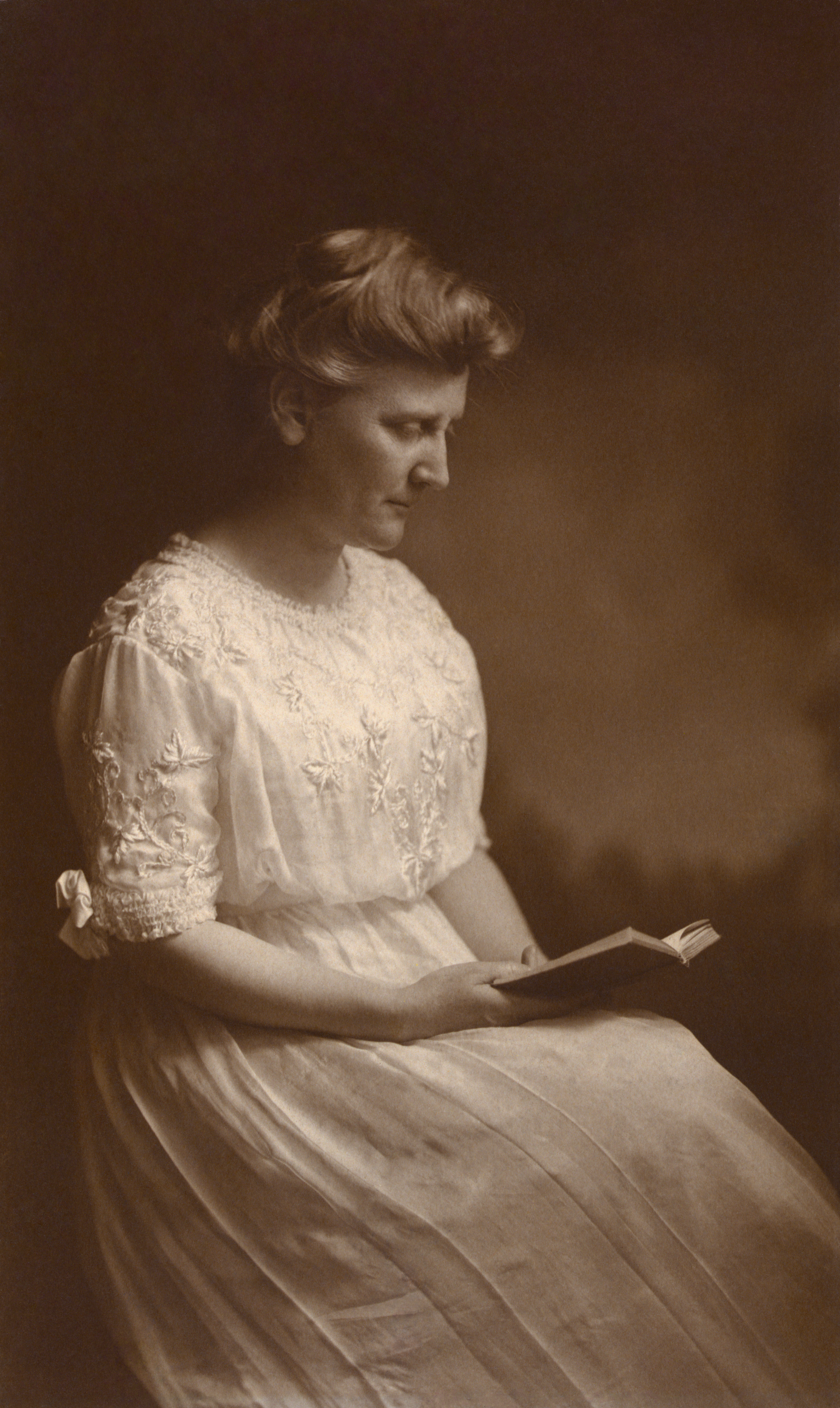
Civil rights activist and journalist Mary White Ovington (1891–1893, no degree)

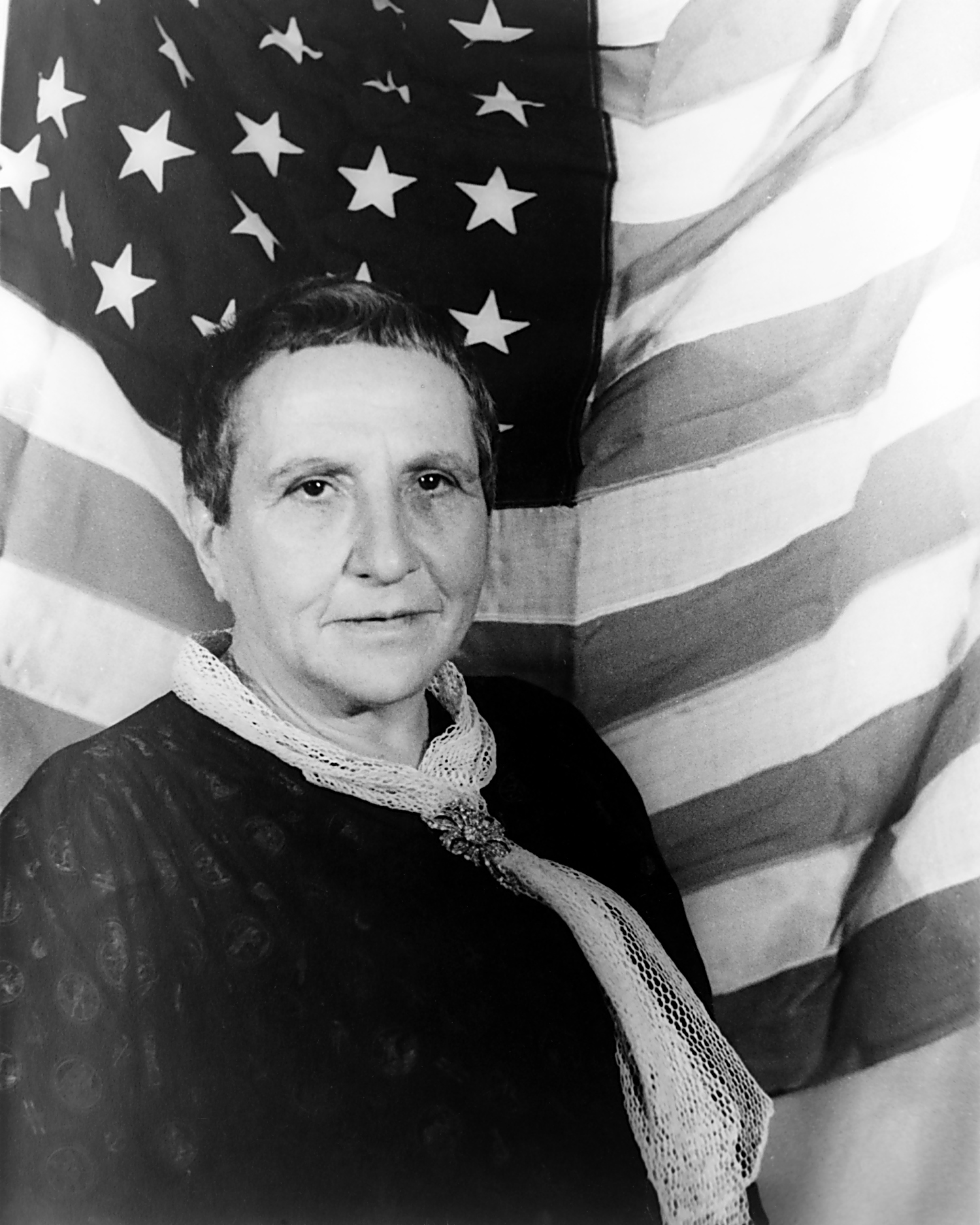
Novelist, playwright, poet Gertrude Stein (AB, 1898)

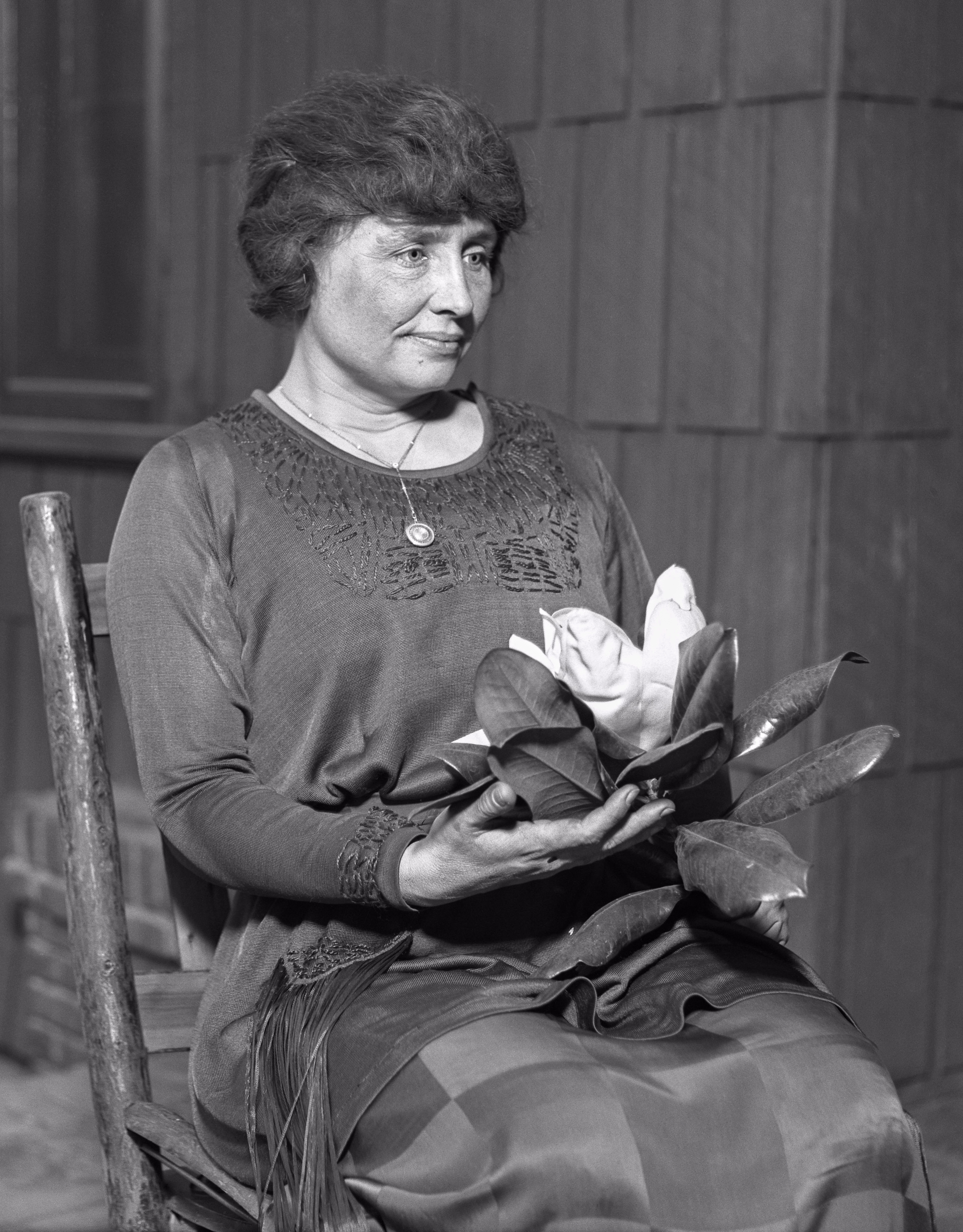
Author, political activist, and lecturer Helen Keller (AB, 1904)

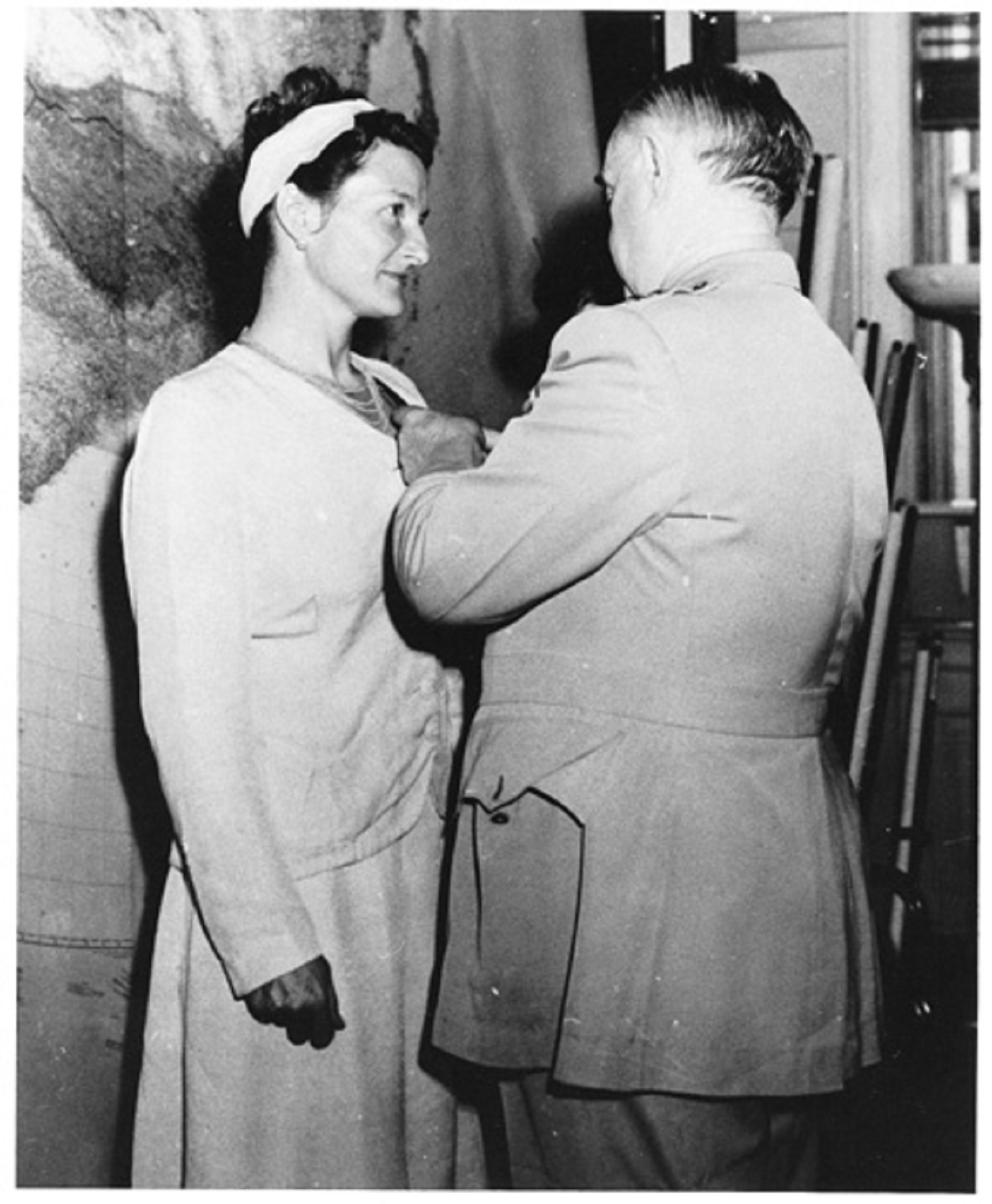
Spy for the United Kingdom and United States Virginia Hall (1924–1925, no degree)

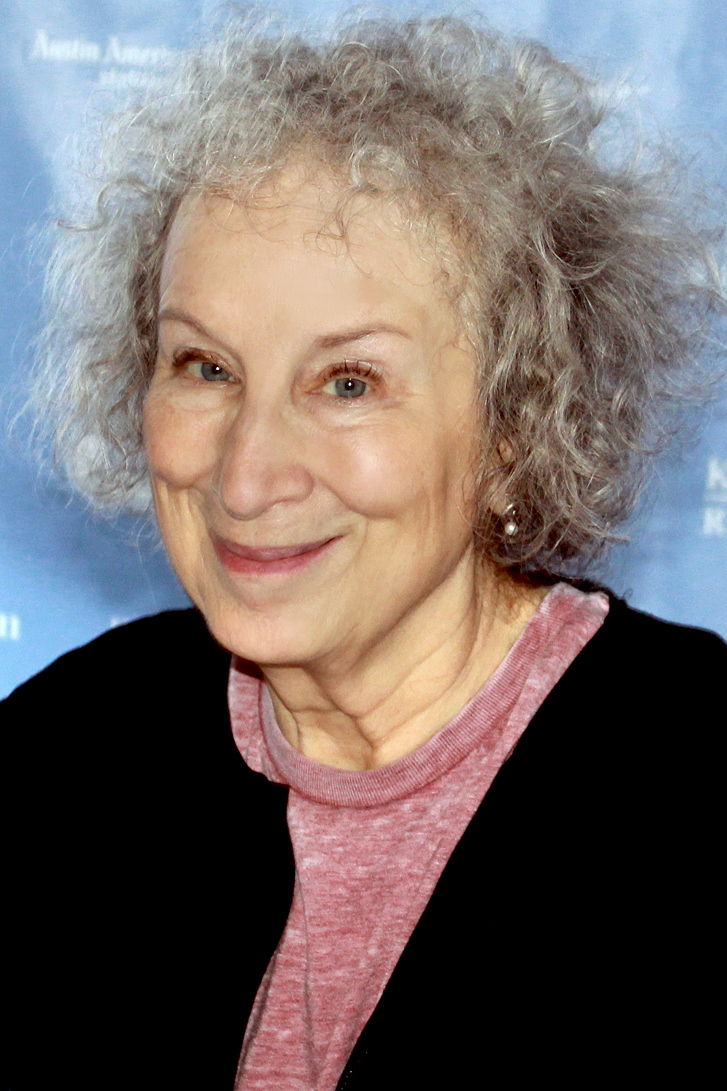
Author Margaret Atwood, (AM, 1962)

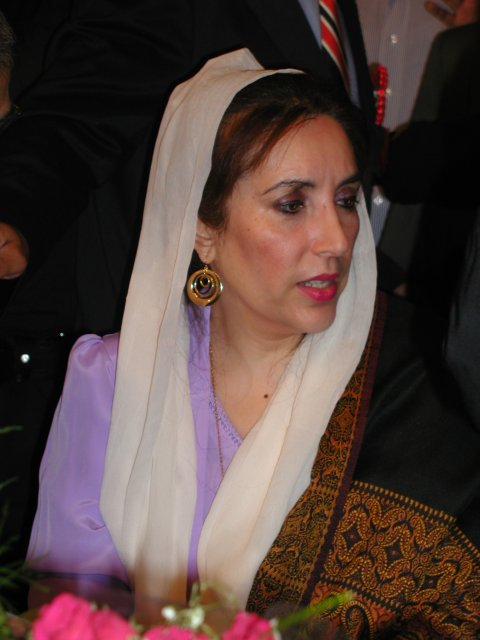
11th and 13th Prime Minister of Pakistan Benazir Bhutto (AB, 1973)

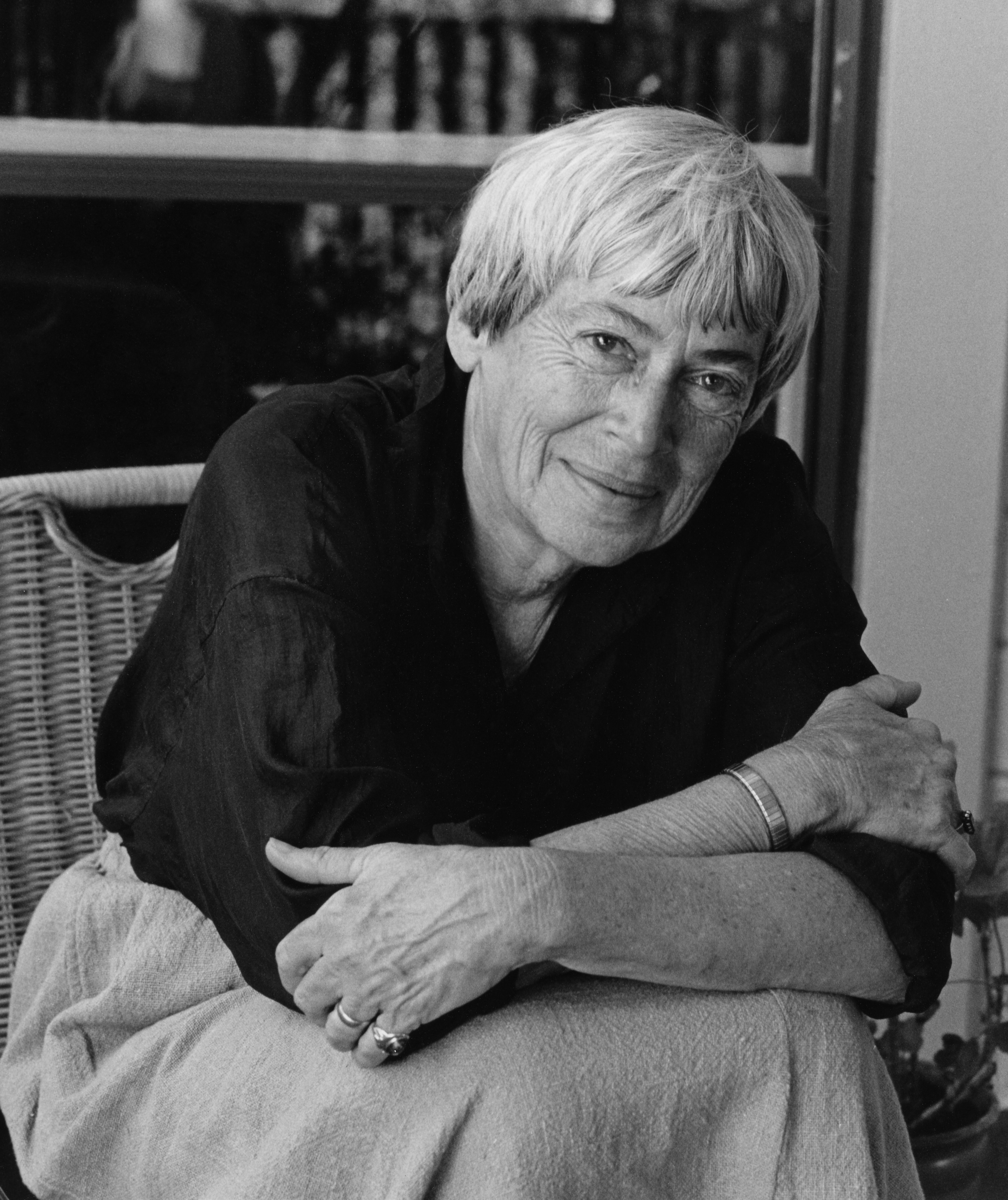
American author, Ursula Le Guin (AB, 1951 in Renaissance French and Italian literature).

A number of Radcliffe alumnae have gone on to become notable in their respective fields:

- Jill Abramson, former executive editor of the New York Times
- Alice Adams, novelist
- Encarnacion Alzona, National Scientist of the Philippines, first Filipino woman to obtain a PhD
- Alice Arlen, screenwriter
- Margaret Atwood, author
- Deborah Batts, U.S. District Court Judge, Southern District of New York; first openly LGBT African American federal judge
- Susan Berresford, Ford Foundation president
- Benazir Bhutto, former prime minister of Pakistan
- Melissa Block, journalist and host of National Public Radio's All Things Considered
- Marita Bonner, poet, essayist and writer associated with the Harlem Renaissance and New Negro Movements
- Alice Bourneuf, economist, educator
- Sylvia Mathews Burwell, Secretary of Health and Human Services
- Caroline Walker Bynum, medieval historian
- Stockard Channing, actress
- Sarah Norcliffe Cleghorn, educator, author, social reformer, and poet
- Leda Cosmides, psychologist
- Lindsay Crouse, actress
- Martha Derthick, academic and noted scholar of public administration
- Anne d'Harnoncourt, curator and former CEO and director of the Philadelphia Museum of Art
- Eva Beatrice Dykes, Ph.D., first black American woman to fulfill the requirements for a doctoral degree
- Elizabeth Eisenstein, historian
- Barbara Epstein, founder of The New York Review of Books
- Mathea Falco, Assistant Secretary of State for International Narcotics and Law Enforcement Affairs
- Ann Kindrick Fischer (1919–1971), American social anthropologist
- Lucy Nettie Fletcher (1886-1918), WWI nurse
- Amy Goodman, journalist and host of Democracy Now!
- Ellen Goodman, Boston Globe columnist
- Jamie Gorelick, Deputy U.S. Attorney General
- Linda Greenhouse, Pulitzer Prize-winning reporter.
- Lani Guinier, Harvard Law professor and civil rights activist
- Amy Gutmann, University of Pennsylvania president
- Martha Hackett, actor
- Virginia Hall, American spy with the Special Operations Executive during WWII
- Judith Lewis Herman, American psychiatrist, researcher, teacher, & author
- Elizabeth Holtzman, member of U.S. Congress
- Elizabeth Hubbard, actor
- Josephine Hull, Oscar-winning stage and film actress
- Catharine Sargent Huntington, (class of 1911) actress, producer, director, founder of multiple theater companies, activist
- Rona Jaffe, popular novelist
- Miriam M. Johnson, sociologist
- Roberta Karmel (born 1937), Centennial Professor of Law at Brooklyn Law School, and first female Commissioner of the U.S. Securities and Exchange Commission.
- Helen Keller, deafblind author and activist
- Sinah Estelle Kelley, chemist
- Caroline Kennedy, U.S. Ambassador to Japan, daughter of President John F. Kennedy and Jacqueline Kennedy Onassis
- Margaret Kivelson, space physicist and planetary scientist
- Maxine Kumin, Pulitzer Prize–winning poet
- Ursula Le Guin, author
- Henrietta Swan Leavitt, early Harvard College Observatory astronomer
- Judith Ledeboer, architect
- Ann Lewis, Democratic Party political strategist
- Alison Lurie, academic and Pulitzer Prize-winning author
- Grace Macurdy, classicist
- Pauline Maier, historian at Massachusetts Institute of Technology
- Ursula Marvin, Smithsonian geologist who analyzed Sputnik 4; first woman on American research teams to travel to Antarctica
- Empress Masako of Japan
- Margaret Mayall, astronomer
- Laura Meneses, political activist
- Ruth Messinger, politician and CEO of American Jewish World Service
- Jane Nickerson, first New York Times food editor and restaurant critic
- Andrea Nye, feminist philosopher and writer
- Soledad O'Brien, broadcast journalist
- Ursula Oppens, classical pianist
- Mary White Ovington, co-founder of the NAACP and women's rights activist
- Maud Wood Park, suffragette and women's rights activist
- Diane Paulus, artistic director of the American Repertory Theater
- Carol Potter, television actress
- Eve Troutt Powell, historian, winner of MacArthur Foundation "genius award"
- Naomi Quinn, anthropologist
- Bonnie Raitt, blues musician
- Lois Rice, vice president of the College Board and architect of the Pell Grant
- Adrienne Rich, poet and feminist
- Margaret W. Rossiter, historian of science, recipient of MacArthur Fellows Program "genius grant", Margaret W. Rossiter History of Women in Science Prize awarded by the History of Science Society is named after her
- Christina Schlesinger, painter
- Alberta Virginia Scott, first African-American Radcliffe graduate (1898)
- Carla Shatz, neurobiologist at Stanford University; member of National Academy of Sciences and Institute of Medicine
- Ann Loomis Silsbee, composer and poet
- Elsie Singmaster, author
- Anna Deavere Smith, performance artist
- Muriel S. Snowden, social worker, founder of Freedom House, MacArthur Foundation "genius award" winner
- Gertrude Stein, author
- Doris Zemurray Stone, archaeologist and ethnographer
- Renee Tajima-Peña, Academy Award-nominated filmmaker and director of Who Killed Vincent Chin? and No más bebés
- Frances Euphemia Thompson, art educator
- Barbara Tuchman, historian
- Marina von Neumann Whitman, economist
- Julia Grace Wales, peace activist
- Elizabeth Washburn Wright, anti-opium campaigner, abolitionist & diplomatic strategist for international human rights in the United States.
- Suzy Welch, business writer and former editor of Harvard Business Review
- Lally Weymouth, senior associate editor of the Washington Post

== In popular culture ==
=== Literature ===
- Rona Jaffe's novel Class Reunion and Alice Adams' novel Superior Women both deal with the lives of Radcliffe women in their college years and afterwards.
- Love with a Harvard Accent is a 1962 novel written jointly by Bill Bayer and Nancy Jenkin under the pen name Leonie St. John. It tells the stories of three Radcliffe students coming of age along the bridge between the late 50s and early 1960s. The Harvard Crimson reviewed the book when it was published in an article entitled "Radcliffe's New Catalog."
- Splendor & Misery is a 1983 novel by Faye Levine that follows the college experience of Sarah Galbreath, a Radcliffe student in Cambridge in the early and mid 1960s.
- A Small Circle of Friends is a film set at Harvard and Radcliffe in the Vietnam era. In it Karen Allen plays Jessica Bloom, a Radcliffe student caught up with two Harvard students in the activism and feminist awakening of the time.
- Phillip Roth's novel Goodbye, Columbus is set in part at Radcliffe. The movie version was filmed in part at the college.
- Tom Miller's fantasy novel The Philosopher's Flight is about a male student at Radcliffe in 1917.

=== Writing ===
- In 1963, as a Radcliffe undergraduate, Faye Levine wrote an article for the Harvard Crimson that became a classic and thereafter frequently quoted characterization of Radcliffe undergraduates, entitled "The Three Flavors of Radcliffe." The three flavors were peach, chocolate, and lime.

=== Film ===
- The film and novel versions of Love Story are set partly at Radcliffe and involve a student named Jennifer Cavalleri and her romance with Harvard student Oliver Barrett IV. The movie was filmed in part at Radcliffe.
- A large part of Professor Marston and the Wonder Women is based on and portrays events which occurred at the college.

== See also ==
- Radcliffe Choral Society
- Radcliffe Pitches
- Radcliffe Institute for Advanced Study
- Schlesinger Library
- List of coordinate colleges
