= Faye Levine =

American writer and feminist

- Born: January 18, 1944; Stamford, Connecticut
- Died: November 18, 2014 (aged 70)
- Resting place: Putnam Valley, New York
- Education: Harvard University
- Occupations: Writer and feminist
- Organization: Redstockings
- Known for: Being the first woman executive editor of The Harvard Crimson
- Notable work: Splendor and Misery: A Novel of Harvard (1983)

Faye Levine (18 January 1944 – 18 November 2014) was an American writer and feminist. She was the first woman to serve as the executive editor of the Harvard Crimson.

== Early life and Harvard ==
Faye Iris Levine was born on 18 January 1944 in Stamford, Connecticut, the daughter of Bernard Harold Shulman (died 1954) and Lillian Haft. She grew up in Peekskill, New York. Her surname came from her adoptive father, Seymour Levine, who her mother married in 1955. She had one sister, Mina.

Levine earned undergraduate and graduate degrees from Harvard University, gaining her B.A. in History and Literature in 1965, her Master of Education in 1970, and her B.I. in 1974. While at Harvard, she became the first woman executive editor of the Harvard Crimson and the first woman candidate for Harvard Class Marshal. She was a student there at the same time as novelist Margaret Atwood. Levine also spent a year living in India as a Fulbright scholar, where she taught English while living on a houseboat.

Levine became "famous overnight at Harvard" for her 1963 article "The Three Flavors of Radcliffe". In 1982, introducing Levine's 1965 essay "The girls who go to Harvard", The Harvard Book, wrote:

Among Harvard people of both sexes who go back to the mid-60s, Faye Levine is famed for three things. She was the first woman executive editor of the Harvard Crimson, she wrote a much quoted article on "the three flavors of Radcliffe," and she ran a bold, spectacular, unsuccessful campaign for marshal of the Harvard Class of 1965.

Levine became a fellow of the Harvard Radcliffe Institute.

== Writing ==
Levine wrote on a range of subjects for many magazines, and was a contributor to publications including Lapham's Quarterly, The Atlantic, Rolling Stone, The New Yorker, and Harper's Magazine. She wrote four books (two novels and two works of non-fiction). Her first novel, Solomon and Sheba (1980), was adapted for the stage and had a limited run off-Broadway.

Her second novel, Splendor and Misery: A Novel of Harvard (1983) was a largely autobiographical account of her time at the university. It was described as "an elegant and witty fable," and John Leonard of The New York Times called it "marvelous... a splendid first novel".

Levine was a consulting editor on, and contributor to, Feminist Revolution (1978), a collection published by the women's liberation group Redstockings, with which she had been involved since 1973.

At the time of her death, Levine was working on a fifth book, Pythagoras: A Romantic Triangle.

== Death ==
Faye Levine died at home on 18 November 2014, and was privately interred in Putnam Valley, New York.

== Bibliography ==
- The Strange World of the Hare Krishnas (1974)
- The Culture Barons: An Analysis of Power and Money in the Arts (1976)
- Solomon and Sheba (1980)
- Splendor and Misery: A Novel of Harvard (1983)
