= Linda S. Wilson =

American academic administrator (1936–2026)

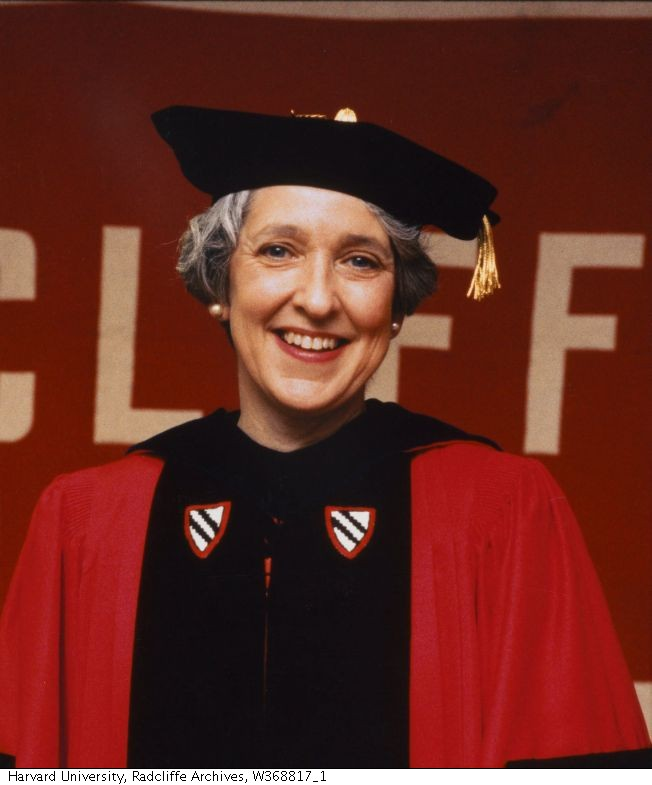
- Wilson as president of Radcliffe College

7th President of Radcliffe College
- In office 1989–1999
- Preceded by: Matina Horner

Personal details
- Born: November 10, 1936 Washington, D.C., U.S.
- Died: January 1, 2026 (aged 89)
- Children: 2
- Education: H. Sophie Newcomb Memorial College (AB); University of Wisconsin–Madison (PhD)
- Occupation: Academic administrator

Linda S. Wilson (November 10, 1936 – January 1, 2026) was an American academic administrator who served as president of Radcliffe College from 1989 to 1999.

== Early life ==
Wilson was born in Washington, D.C. on November 10, 1936.

== Education ==
Wilson received an A.B. with honors from H. Sophie Newcomb Memorial College at Tulane University (1957), and went on to receive a Ph.D in Chemistry from the University of Wisconsin-Madison (1962). She, also, received an Honorary Doctorate in Humane Letters from Newcomb College at Tulane University and an Honorary Doctorate of Letters from the University of Maryland and Tulane University.

== Career ==
Between 1964 and 1969, Wilson was a researcher and teacher at the University of Maryland, the University of Southampton in England, and the University of Missouri. Wilson became a university administrator at Washington University in St. Louis (1969–1974), and the University of Illinois, Urbana-Champaign (1975–1985). From 1985 to 1989, Wilson was vice president for research at the University of Michigan.

Wilson served as President of Radcliffe College from 1989 to 1999. She started several programs during her tenure. In 1991, she initiated the Radcliffe Research Partnership Program to foster undergraduate research opportunities. In 1993, she began the Radcliffe Public Policy Institute to encourage interdisciplinary research between scholars, policymakers, business and labor leaders, and members of the media. In 1993, Wilson, along with faculty members at Radcliffe College and six other Boston institutions, helped to start the Graduate Consortium in Women’s Studies to further advance scholarship in women's studies. After Harvard University and Radcliffe agreed to merge and created the Radcliffe Institute for Advanced Study in 1999, Wilson ended her tenure as president.

She acted as an advisor to the United States Department of Energy and the National Research Council. She also served as a director for ICANN from October 1998 to June 26, 2003.

Wilson was a Trustee of the Committee on Economic Development, a Director of Myriad Genetics, Inc. and Inacom, Inc., and Honorary Trustee of the Massachusetts General Hospital, a member of the Board of Visitors for the University of Wisconsin College of Letters and Science, and a member of the Dean's Advisory Council of Newcomb College.

She was a member of Phi Beta Kappa, Sigma Xi, and was a fellow of the American Association for the Advancement of Science. In addition, she was a member of the Institute of Medicine of the National Academy of Science, and the Research Roundtable of the National Academy of Sciences.

== Personal life and death ==
Wilson was married, and had two children. She died on January 1, 2026, at the age of 89 in Auburn, Maine.
