= List of After Words interviews first aired in 2013 =

After Words is an American television series on the C-SPAN2 network’s weekend programming schedule known as Book TV. The program is an hour-long talk show, each week featuring an interview with the author of a new nonfiction book. The program has no regular host. Instead, each author is paired with a guest host who is familiar with the author or the subject matter of their book.

First air date (Links to video)	Interviewee(s)	Interviewer(s)	Book	Topic of interview / Comments
January 5, 2013	Martin Duberman	Nick Serpe	Howard Zinn: A Life on the Left	Howard Zinn
January 12, 2013	Michael Austin	David Fontana	That's Not What They Meant!: Reclaiming the Founding Fathers from America's Right Wing	Founding Fathers of the United States
January 19, 2013	Clayborne Carson	Janet Langhart Cohen	Martin's Dream: My Journey and the Legacy of Martin Luther King, Jr.	Martin Luther King Jr.
January 26, 2013	Helaine Olen	Russell Wild	Pound Foolish: Exposing the Dark Side of the Personal Finance Industry	
February 2, 2013	Jonathan Last	D'Vera Cohn	What to Expect When No One's Expecting: America's Coming Demographic Disaster	
February 9, 2013	John Mackey	Kim Strassel	Conscious Capitalism	
February 16, 2013	Sarah Garland	Marc Lamont Hill	Divided We Fail: The Story of an African-American Community That Ended the Era of School Desegregation	
February 23, 2013	Ed Whitacre	Stephanie Mehta	American Turnaround: Reinventing AT&T and GM and the Way We Do Business in the USA	
March 2, 2013	Moisés Naím	Lillian Cunningham	The End of Power: From Boardrooms to Battlefields and Churches to States, Why Being In Charge Isn't What It Used to Be	
March 9, 2013	Ken Stern	Ken Berger	With Charity for All: Why Charities are Failing and a Better Way to Give	
March 16, 2013	Kim Ghattas	Jamie Weinstein	The Secretary: A Journey with Hillary Clinton from Beirut to the Heart of American Power	Hillary Clinton
March 23, 2013	David Burstein	S. E. Cupp	Fast Future: How the Millennial Generation is Shaping Our World	
March 30, 2013	Martin Clancy, Tim O'Brien	Kimberly Tignor	Murder at the Supreme Court: Lethal Crimes and Landmark Cases	
April 6, 2013	Neil Irwin	David Wessel	The Alchemists: Three Central Bankers and a World on Fire	
April 20, 2013	Benjamin Wiker	Krissah Thompson	Worshipping the State: How Liberalism Became Our State Religion	
April 27, 2013	Karen Houppert	Jenna Greene	Chasing Gideon: The Elusive Quest for Poor People's Justice	
May 4, 2013	Vali Nasr	Judith Yaphe	The Dispensable Nation: American Foreign Policy in Retreat	
May 11, 2013	Christian Caryl	Susan Glasser	Strange Rebels: 1979 and the Birth of the 21st Century	
May 18, 2013	Diana West	Ariel Cohen	American Betrayal: The Secret Assault on Our Nation's Character	
May 25, 2013	Olympia Snowe	A.B. Stoddard	Fighting for Common Ground: How We Can Fix the Stalemate in Congress	
June 1, 2013	Charles Moore	Toby Harnden	Margaret Thatcher: From Grantham to the Falklands	Margaret Thatcher
June 8, 2013	Sally Satel	Dan Vergano	Brainwashed: The Seductive Appeal of Mindless Neuroscience	
June 15, 2013	Carl Hart	Juan Williams	High Price: A Neuroscientist's Journey of Self-Discovery That Challenges Everything You Know about Drugs and Society	
June 22, 2013	Laurence Leamer	Neela Banerjee	The Price of Justice: A True Story of Greed and Corruption	Massey Energy
June 29, 2013	Victor Davis Hanson	Kimberly Kagan	The Savior Generals: How Five Commanders Saved Wars that Were Lost - From Ancient Greece to Iraq	
July 6, 2013	Michele Swers	Emily Pierce	Women in the Club: Gender and Policy Making in the Senate	Women in the United States Senate
July 13, 2013	Mario Livio	Marty Makary	Brilliant Blunders: From Darwin to Einstein - Colossal Mistakes by Great Scientists That Changed Our Understanding of Life and the Universe	
July 20, 2013	Barbara Perry	Vincent Bzdek	Rose Kennedy: The Life and Times of a Political Matriarch	Rose Kennedy
July 27, 2013	Sheila Miyoshi Jager	Scott Snyder	Brothers at War: The Unending Conflict in Korea	North Korea–South Korea relations
August 3, 2013	Susan Crawford	Andrew Blum	Captive Audience: The Telecom Industry and Monopoly Power in the New Gilded Age	Internet access, Internet in the United States
August 10, 2013	Leigh Gallagher	Rich Benjamin	The End of the Suburbs: Where the American Dream is Moving	
August 17, 2013	Joshua Dubler	Josef Sorett	Down in the Chapel: Religious Life in an American Prison	
August 24, 2013	Elizabeth Greenspan	Ken Feinberg	Battle for Ground Zero: Inside the Political Struggle to Rebuild the World Trade Center	
August 31, 2013	Craig Steven Wilder	Joe Madison	Ebony & Ivy: Race, Slavery, and the Troubled History of America's Universities	
September 7, 2013	Paul Sabin	Dina Cappiello	The Bet: Paul Ehrlich, Julian Simon and Our Gamble over Earth's Future	Simon–Ehrlich wager
September 14, 2013	Mark Tushnet	Jenna Greene	In the Balance: Politics in the Roberts Court	
September 21, 2013	Emily Miller	Craig Whitney	Emily Gets Her Gun... But Obama Wants to Take Yours	
September 28, 2013	Eric Schlosser	Lynn Davis	Command and Control: Nuclear Weapons, the Damascus Accident, and the Illusion of Safety	
October 5, 2013	Bob Lutz	Debbie Dingell	Icons and Idiots: Straight Talk on Leadership	
October 12, 2013	Luis Gutierrez	Alfonso Aguilar	Still Dreaming: My Journey from the Barrio to Capitol Hill	
October 19, 2013	Richard Dawkins	Sally Quinn	An Appetite for Wonder: The Making of a Scientist	
October 26, 2013	Ann Dowsett Johnston	Anne Herron	Drink: The Intimate Relationship Between Women and Alcohol	
November 2, 2013	S. Lochlann Jain	Dr. Marty Makary	Malignant: How Cancer Becomes Us	
November 9, 2013	Husain Haqqani	Lisa Curtis	Magnificent Delusions: Pakistan, the United States, and an Epic History of Misunderstanding	Pakistan–United States relations
November 16, 2013	Abbe Smith, Vida Johnson	Debbie Hines	How Can You Represent Those People?	
November 23, 2013	Larry Sabato	Craig Shirley	The Kennedy Half-Century: The Presidency, Assassination, and Lasting Legacy of John F. Kennedy	Assassination of John F. Kennedy
November 30, 2013	Brian Kilmeade	Richard Brookhiser	George Washington's Secret Six: The Spy Ring that Saved the American Revolution	
December 7, 2013	Michael Kimmel	Hanna Rosin	Angry White Men: American Masculinity at the End of an Era	
December 14, 2013	Nicholas Carnes	Kim Dixon	White-Collar Government: The Hidden Role of Class in Economic Policy Making	
December 21, 2013	Heraldo Muñoz	Kim Barker	Getting Away with Murder: Benazir Bhutto's Assassination and the Politics of Pakistan	Assassination of Benazir Bhutto
December 28, 2013	Peter Gottschalk	Michelle Boorstein	American Heretics: Catholics, Jews, Muslims and the History of Religious Intolerance	
