= Media Access Project =

American advocacy organization

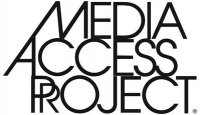
- Founded: 1972
- Dissolved: 2012
- Location: Washington, D.C., United States
- Region served: United States of America
- Key people: Andrew Jay Schwartzman
- Website: mediaaccessproject.org

The Media Access Project (or MAP) was a non-profit group that promoted the public's interest before Congress and the US court system. MAP grew out of a 1960s lawsuit against the United Church of Christ and was eventually formed in 1972 in order to advance the rights of the public wanting to participate in the democratic process. Some of their first cases involved two TV stations in Mississippi not catering to the African American Community, resulting in the stations almost being shut down. From that era and cases came the thought "that members of the viewing and listening public have the legal right, derived from the First Amendment, to participate in FCC proceedings." Their most common way of fighting cases was through lobbying. The group suspended operations on May 1, 2012.

== Issues addressed ==
=== Comcast NBC-Universal deal ===
On January 18, 2011, cable and internet giant Comcast acquired NBC Universal in a blockbuster deal. At the time, Comcast was the largest distributor of video services in the United States. The FCC voted in favor of it by a 4-1 count. The deal gave Comcast a 51% ownership of NBC Universal, and "For Comcast, the purchase is the realization of its long-held ambition to be a major producer of television shows and movies". There was some concern about media consolidation, as expressed by Michael J. Copps, commissioner of the FCC. "Every citizen has a stake here,” given the size of the combined entity. “The lodestar for this review must be the public interest". The Media Access Project is concerned that the terms of the deal prevent competition, and could result in price gouging due to fewer media sources. Critics fear that "Comcast will act as a gatekeeper by limiting the ability of independent voices to get a slot on cable distribution systems, or by withholding NBC-Universal content from other platforms and providers".

=== Media ownership ===
The issue revolves around the idea that those who control the media control what information people do and don't have access to. According to Free Press, "these massive conglomerates — like General Electric, Time Warner and News Corporation — only care about the bottom line, not serving the public interest. And allowing these few firms too much control over the flow of news and information is dangerous for our democracy".

In 2003, the Media Access Project's lawyers filed a petition with the U.S. Court of Appeals, trying to nullify the FCC's media ownership rules that were going to take effect. The case was filed on behalf of Prometheus Radio Project of Philadelphia and the Media Access Project wanted to prevent the new media ownership rules until the judicial review was completed. The court ended up siding with the Media Access Project and struck down the FCC's new media ownership regulations.

On March 23, 2010, the U.S. Court of Appeals lifted a ban that had prevented media companies from owning both a TV station and newspaper in the same region, or market.

Part of the media ownership debate includes that of media concentration. Media concentration is when a large amount of media outlets are owned by a small number of companies. According to the MAP website, media concentration not only limits diversity, but also "threatens an outlet's accountability to local communities, since big companies are often unfamiliar with a community's specific needs." In the early 1980s, the Reagan administration started deregulating the media and broadcasting industries, which led to increased consolidation. Media Access Project Director Andrew Schwartzman commented that "deregulation has brought a new breed of broadcaster to whom public service matters less."

=== Net neutrality ===
One of the larger issues that Media Access Project concerned itself with was the concept of Net Neutrality. For MAP the main focus with net neutrality was urging the FCC to ensure that network operators do not block or slow down the transmission of certain types of online content. One of the bigger cases that lead to current net neutrality rules was in 2007 when internet service provider Comcast was caught directly manipulating or blocking their subscriber's access to the popular file sharing service BitTorrent. MAP filed a petition with the FCC stating that Comcast had violated several of the agencies policies.

A more recent court case dealing with the net neutrality rules being challenged by cellular giant Verizon Wireless was thrown out because the lawsuit was supposedly filed prematurely. Specifically Verizon Wireless was challenging the Open Internet Framework and felt that the FCC had too broad of an authority for the new regulation of broadband network. However MAP senior vice president Andrew Schwartzman hinted that Verizon was trying to exploit the system saying that "it was a blatant effort to steer the case to a sympathetic court, but the judges agreed that the appeal was prematurity was incurable.”

=== Spectrum access ===
Spectrum access refers to the electromagnetic spectrum, which is a set of frequency bands that transmit electronic communications. The Media Access Project had three principles involving spectrum management: “Spectrum belongs to the public, and the law prevents the FCC from turning it into private property; those with exclusive rights to use spectrum must also serve the public interest; and the public is best served by allowing as many people, institutions, and other entities to use spectrum space as technology will permit, the FCC should therefore expand unlicensed uses to the extent technology allows.” The MAP argues that allowing greater public access to the spectrum would allow greater social and economic growth.

In 2002, the FCC granted additional flexibility for spectrum use, which led to many public interest groups and wireless carriers to send comments about the policy change. The comments covered a variety of topics from redefining harmful interference and rural spectrum management. There was also a debate between whether or not there should be an increase in usable spectrum between public interest groups and wireless service providers.

The FCC allowed a new portion of high-frequency spectrum to be allocated for WiFi networks in 2003. The spectrum was open to any company and did not require the purchase of a license, but was limited by how much power a device could use to transmit the signal. Associate Director of the MAP, Harold Feld, claimed that combining a high frequency and low power limits would mean that the allocated spectrum would be too weak its intended purpose.

In 2007, the Media Access Project was a part of the Save Our Spectrum Coalition, whose goal was to allow consumers to use any equipment, content, application or service without interference or discrimination from network providers. The group wanted network providers to bid on the spectrum through separate affiliates operating under open access conditions. Later, the Media Access Project claimed that the incumbent companies that already owned spectrum access blocked new competitors from entering the market. The group stated that if the auction had been anonymous, smaller companies would be more likely to bid against the incumbent companies.

== Notable staff ==
=== Andrew Jay Schwartzman ===
Andrew Schwartzman is a media attorney who held senior leadership positions at MAP from June 1978 until 2012. He held positions including President, CEO, Senior Vice President, and Policy Director. He represented MAP before Congress, the FCC and the courts on issues such as cable TV regulation, minority and female ownership and employment in the mass media,“equal time” laws and cable “open access”. Since 2014, he has been based at the Communications and Technology Law Clinic at Georgetown's Institute for Public Representation.

=== Gigi Sohn ===
Gigi Sohn is an American lawyer who is the co-founder (with Laurie Racine and David Bollier) of Public Knowledge. She previously worked for the Ford Foundation. She joined MAP in 1988, holding the position of Executive Director.

In October 2021, Joe Biden nominated her to lead the Federal Communications Commission. Following a delayed and drawn out confirmation process, and amidst hostile opposition from Republicans, she withdrew her nomination in March 2023, citing extensive lobbying and "unrelenting, dishonest and cruel attacks" against her.

She is now a Distinguished Fellow at the Georgetown Law Institute for Technology Law & Policy, and a board member at the Electronic Frontier Foundation.

=== Tyrone Brown ===
Tyrone Brown is an American attorney and retired government official. From 1977 to 1981, Brown served as a member of the Federal Communications Commission (FCC). He served president of the Media Access Project from 2010 to 2013.
