= Series of tubes =

Phrase used by Ted Stevens to describe the Internet

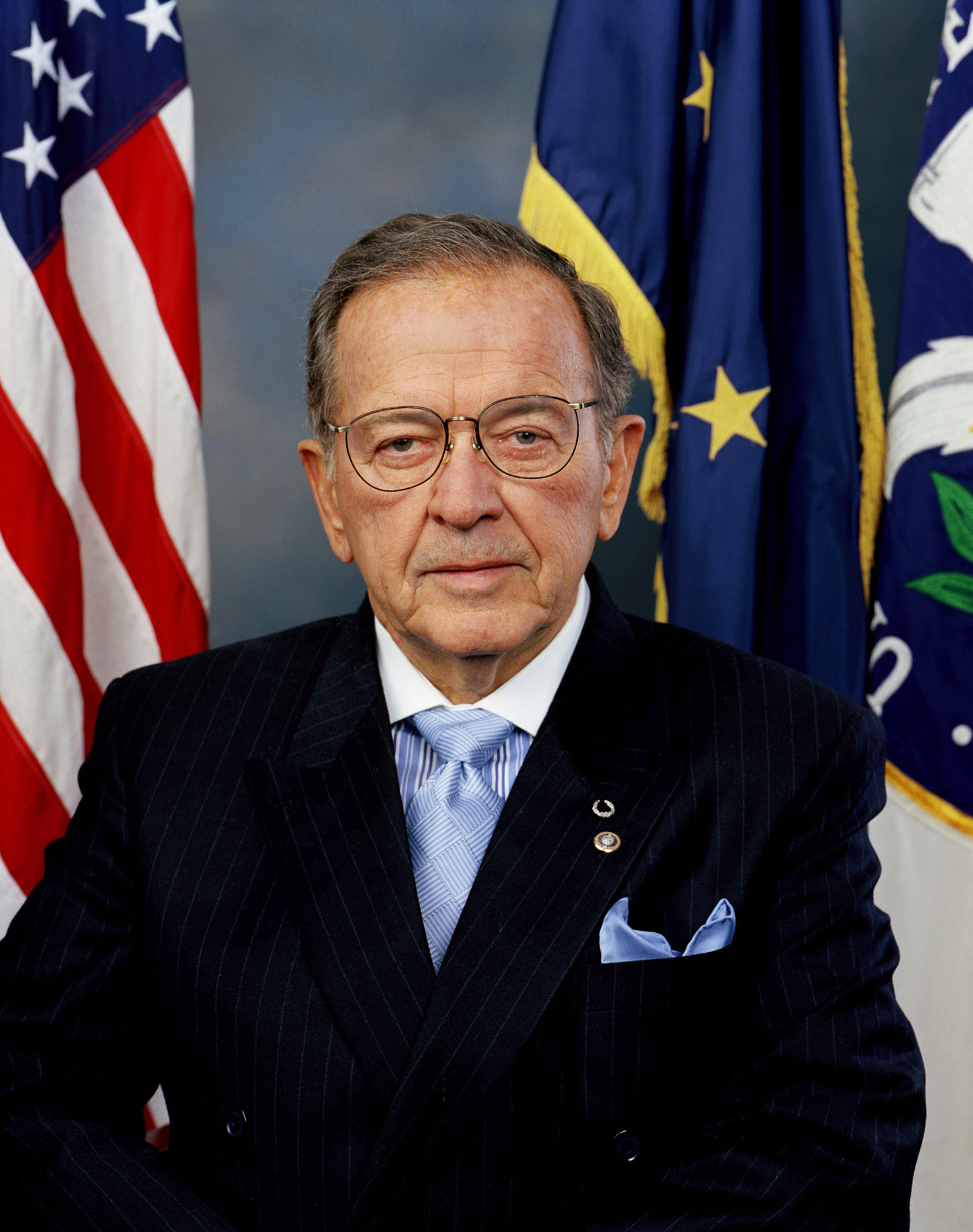
Ted Stevens referred to the Internet as "a series of tubes" during his term as Alaskan Senator.

"A series of tubes" is a phrase used originally as an analogy by then-United States Senator Ted Stevens (R-Alaska) to describe the Internet in the context of opposing net neutrality. On June 28, 2006, he used this metaphor to criticize a proposed amendment to a committee bill. The amendment would have prohibited Internet service providers such as AT&T, Comcast, Time Warner Cable and Verizon Communications from charging fees to give some companies' data a higher priority in relation to other traffic. The metaphor was widely ridiculed, because Stevens was perceived to have displayed an extremely limited understanding of the Internet, despite his leading the Senate committee responsible for regulating it.

== Partial text of Stevens's comments ==
Ted Stevens's quotes
I got it yesterday

Series of tubes

Ten movies streaming across that, that Internet, and what happens to your own personal Internet? I just the other day got... an Internet [email] was sent by my staff at 10 o'clock in the morning on Friday. I got it yesterday [Tuesday]. Why? Because it got tangled up with all these things going on the Internet commercially. [...] They want to deliver vast amounts of information over the Internet. And again, the Internet is not something that you just dump something on. It's not a big truck. It's a series of tubes. And if you don't understand, those tubes can be filled and if they are filled, when you put your message in, it gets in line and it's going to be delayed by anyone that puts into that tube enormous amounts of material, enormous amounts of material.

== Media commentary ==
On June 28, 2006, Public Knowledge government affairs manager Alex Curtis wrote a brief blog entry introducing the senator's speech and posted an MP3 recording. The next day, the Wired magazine blog 27B Stroke 6 featured a lengthier post by Ryan Singel, which included Singel's transcriptions of some parts of Stevens's speech considered the most humorous. Within days, thousands of other blogs and message boards posted the story.

Most writers and commentators derisively cited several of Stevens's misunderstandings of Internet technology, arguing that the speech showed that he had formed a strong opinion on a topic which he understood poorly (e.g., referring to an e-mail message as "an Internet," and blaming bandwidth issues for an e-mail problem much more likely to be caused by mail server or routing issues). The story sparked mainstream media attention, including a mention in The New York Times. The technology podcast This Week in Tech also discussed the incident.

According to The Wall Street Journal, as summarized by MediaPost commentator Ross Fadner, "'The Internet is a Series of Tubes!' spawned a new slogan that became a rallying cry for Net neutrality advocates. ... Stevens's overly simplistic description of the Web's infrastructure made it easy for pro-neutrality activists to label the other side as old and out-of-touch." Several parodies of Stevens's speech have been created, usually consisting of samples taken from this speech with an added melody.

Edward Felten, Princeton University professor of computer science, pointed out the unfairness of some criticisms of Stevens's wording, while maintaining that the underlying arguments were rather weak.

A piece in PC Gamer later claimed that while Stevens was ineloquent in his presentation the analogy itself was accurate.

Journalist Andrew Blum, in his 2012 book Tubes: A Journey to the Center of the Internet which explores physical Internet infrastructure, defended Stevens's analogy as being essentially correct: "But one thing [the Internet] most certainly is, nearly everywhere, is, in fact, a series of tubes".

Decades later, in an opinion piece on the 2025 Supreme Court case Cox v. Sony (regarding copyright infringement), the Wall Street Journal averred that "...Cox has the better argument that dumb tubes shouldn't be legally responsible for their users' wrongdoing."

== In popular culture ==
The Daily Show with Jon Stewart made multiple references to "Techno" Ted Stevens's "series of tubes" description; as a result, Stevens has become well known as the person who once headed the committee charged with regulating the Internet. "I have a letter from a big scientist who said I was absolutely right in using the word 'tubes'," Stevens said to reporters in response to The Daily Show's coverage. When asked if he would think about going on the show to debate Jon Stewart, Stevens replied, "I'd consider it."

Google has included references to this in two of its products. Gears's about box once read "the gears that power the tubes" and Google Chrome had an about: Easter egg at the address about:internets which displayed a screensaver of tubes (if Windows XP's SSPIPES.SCR is installed) with the page title "Don't Clog the Tubes!" When "about:internets" was entered on a computer lacking that screensaver, the tab displayed a gray screen with the page title "The Tubes are Clogged!" This Easter egg was removed as of the 2.0.159.1 release. Before December 6, 2022, the documentation for developing Chrome extensions included a near-verbatim quote of the "series of tubes" paragraph when describing its chrome.storage class.

The title of the 2012 book Tubes: A Journey to the Center of the Internet by American author Andrew Blum is a reference to the quote, and Blum defends the analogy as an accurate description of physical networking infrastructure.

The quote is referenced in the game Grand Theft Auto V. When using the game's parody of Google, eyefind.info, the header may read, "It's like a series of tubes". Subsequently, the worldwide launch of Grand Theft Auto VI brought on a global throughput record of 33.03 terabits per second, thus filling the tubes.

In 2017, YouTuber Pyrocynical created a recurring web series titled A Series of Tubes, which uses clips of Ted Steven's voice in the introduction theme.

== Tribute ==
Alexandra Petri of The Washington Post wrote a humorous article entitled "Sen. Stevens, the tubes salute you" on August 9, 2010 after Stevens's death in an airplane crash:

And as people remember him, make ill-timed jests, and muse on his legacy—all in real time, in great profusion—I worry that they are disrupting the ability of people elsewhere to receive their Internets. But for us in the Facebook generation who weren't around for the first plane crash and know the Bridge to Nowhere primarily as an SNL punchline, the senator's legacy is in that series of tubes.

== See also ==
- Congestive collapse
- Fairness measure
- Information superhighway
- Internets
- Network congestion avoidance
