= Information technology law =

Concerns the law of information technology, including computing and the internet

Information technology law (IT law), also known as information, communication and technology law (ICT law) or cyberlaw, concerns the juridical regulation of information technology, its possibilities and the consequences of its use, including computing, software coding, artificial intelligence, the internet and virtual worlds. The ICT field of law comprises elements of various branches of law, originating under various acts or statutes of parliaments, the common and continental law and international law. Some important areas it covers are information and data, communication, and information technology, both software and hardware and technical communications technology, including coding and protocols.

Due to the evolving nature of the technology industry, the legal frameworks governing it vary significantly across jurisdictions and change over time. Information technology law primarily governs the dissemination of digital information and software, information security, and cross-border commerce. It intersects with issues in intellectual property, contract law, criminal law, and fundamental rights such as privacy, the right to self-determination and freedom of expression. Information technology law also addresses emerging issues related to data breaches and artificial intelligence.

Information technology law can also relate directly to dissemination and utlilzation of information within the legal industry, a field known as legal informatics. The nature of this utilisation of data and information technology platform is changing with the adoption of Artificial Intelligence systems, with major lawfirms in the United States of America, Australia, China, and the United Kingdom reporting pilot programs of Artificial Intelligence programs to assist in practices such as legal research, drafting and document review.

== Areas of law ==
IT law does not constitute a separate area of law; rather, it encompasses aspects of contract, intellectual property, privacy and data protection laws. Intellectual property is an important component of IT law, including copyright and authors' rights, rules on fair use, rules on copy protection for digital media and circumvention of such schemes. The area of software patents has been controversial, and is still evolving in Europe and elsewhere.

The related topics of software licenses, end user license agreements, free software licenses and open-source licenses can involve discussion of product liability, professional liability of individual developers, warranties, contract law, trade secrets and intellectual property.

In various countries, areas of the computing and communication industries are regulated – often strictly – by governmental bodies.

There are rules on the uses to which computers and computer networks may be put, in particular there are rules on unauthorized access, data privacy and spamming. There are also limits on the use of encryption and of equipment which may be used to defeat copy protection schemes. The export of hardware and software between certain states within the United States is also controlled.

There are laws governing trade on the Internet, taxation, consumer protection, and advertising.

There are laws on censorship versus freedom of expression, rules on public access to government information, and individual access to information held on them by private bodies. There are laws on what data must be retained for law enforcement, and what may not be gathered or retained, for privacy reasons.

In certain circumstances and jurisdictions, computer communications may be used in evidence, and to establish contracts. New methods of tapping and surveillance made possible by computers have varying rules on how they may be used by law enforcement bodies and as evidence in court.

Computerized voting technology, from polling machines to internet and mobile-phone voting, raise a host of legal issues.

Some states limit access to the Internet, by law as well as by technical means.

== Regulation ==
Global computer-based communications cut across territorial borders, raising issues of regulation, jurisdiction, and sovereignty. The internet has been compared to a "terrain" or "digital place" where large corporations historically set the rules, a dynamic that regulations such as the EU's Digital Services Act seek to change.

=== Jurisdiction ===
Jurisdiction is an aspect of state sovereignty and it refers to judicial, legislative and administrative competence. Although jurisdiction is an aspect of sovereignty, it is not coextensive with it. The laws of a nation may have extraterritorial impact extending the jurisdiction beyond the sovereign and territorial limits of that nation. The medium of the Internet, like electrical telegraph, telephone or radio, does not explicitly recognize sovereignty and territorial limitations. There is no uniform, international jurisdictional law of universal application, and such questions are generally a matter of international treaties and contracts, or conflict of laws, particularly private international law. An example would be where the contents stored on a server located in the United Kingdom, by a citizen of France, and published on a web site, are legal in one country and illegal in another. In the absence of a uniform jurisdictional code, legal practitioners and judges have solved these kind of questions according to the general rules for conflict of law; governments and supra-national bodies did design outlines for new legal frameworks.

=== Regulation alternatives ===
Whether to treat the Internet as if it were physical space and thus subject to a given jurisdiction's laws, or that the Internet should have a legal framework of its own has been questioned. Those who favor the latter view often feel that government should leave the Internet to self-regulate. American poet John Perry Barlow, for example, has addressed the governments of the world and stated, "Where there are real conflicts, where there are wrongs, we will identify them and address them by our means. We are forming our own Social Contract. This governance will arise according to the conditions of our world, not yours. Our world is different". Another view can be read from a wiki-website with the name "An Introduction to Cybersecession", that argues for ethical validation of absolute anonymity on the Internet. It compares the Internet with the human mind and declares: "Human beings possess a mind, which they are absolutely free to inhabit with no legal constraints. Human civilization is developing its own (collective) mind. All we want is to be free to inhabit it with no legal constraints. Since you make sure we cannot harm you, you have no ethical right to intrude our lives. So stop intruding!" The project is defining "you" as "all governments", "we" is undefined. Some scholars argue for more of a compromise between the two notions, such as Lawrence Lessig's argument that "The problem for law is to work out how the norms of the two communities are to apply given that the subject to whom they apply may be in both places at once."

=== Conflict of law ===
With the internationalism of the Internet and the rapid growth of users, jurisdiction became a more difficult area than before, and in the beginning courts in different countries have taken various views on whether they have jurisdiction over items published on the Internet, or business agreements entered into over the Internet. This can cover areas from contract law, trading standards and tax, through rules on unauthorized access, data privacy and spamming to areas of fundamental rights such as freedom of speech and privacy, via state censorship, to criminal law with libel or sedition.

While early theories suggested "cyberspace" was a separate jurisdiction exempt from traditional law, courts have consistently applied existing national laws to internet activity. Conflicting laws from different jurisdictions may apply simultaneously to the same event. The Internet does not tend to make geographical and jurisdictional boundaries clear, but both Internet technology (hardware), the providers of services and its users remain in physical jurisdictions and are subject to laws independent of their presence on the Internet. As such, a single transaction may involve the laws of at least three jurisdictions:

1. the laws of the state/nation in which the user resides,
2. the laws of the state/nation that apply where the server hosting the transaction is located, and
3. the laws of the state/nation which apply to the person or business with whom the transaction takes place.

So a user in one of the United States conducting a transaction with another user that lives in the United Kingdom, through a server in Canada, could theoretically be subject to the laws of all three countries and of international treaties as they relate to the transaction at hand.

In practical terms, a user of the Internet is subject to the laws of the state or nation within which he or she goes online. Thus, in the U.S., in 1997, Jake Baker faced criminal charges for his e-conduct, and numerous users of peer-to-peer file-sharing software were subject to civil lawsuits for copyright infringement. This system runs into conflicts, however, when these suits are international in nature. Simply put, legal conduct in one nation may be decidedly illegal in another. In fact, even different standards concerning the burden of proof in a civil case can cause jurisdictional problems. For example, an American celebrity, claiming to be insulted by an online American magazine, faces a difficult task of winning a lawsuit against that magazine for libel. But if the celebrity has ties, economic or otherwise, to England, he or she can sue for libel in the English court system, where the burden of proof for establishing defamation may make the case more favorable to the plaintiff.

Internet governance is a live issue in international fora such as the International Telecommunication Union (ITU), and the role of the current US-based co-ordinating body, the Internet Corporation for Assigned Names and Numbers (ICANN) was discussed in the UN-sponsored World Summit on the Information Society (WSIS) in December 2003.

== European Union ==
Directives, Regulations and other laws regulating information technology (including the internet, e-commerce, social media and data privacy) in the EU include:

- General Data Protection Regulation
- ePrivacy Directive
- Data Retention Directive (since declared invalid)
- Database Directive, which affords IP protections on databases
- Artificial Intelligence Act
- Digital Services Act
- Digital Markets Act
- Cyber Resilience Act
- Data Governance Act (proposed)
- Digital Fairness Act (proposed)

=== Copyright / authors' right ===
As of 2020, the European Union copyright law consists of 13 directives and 2 regulations, harmonising the essential rights of authors, performers, producers and broadcasters. The legal framework reduces national discrepancies, and guarantees the level of protection needed to foster creativity and investment in creativity. Many of the directives reflect obligations under the Berne Convention and the Rome Convention, as well as the obligations of the EU and its Member States under the World Trade Organisation 'TRIPS' Agreement and the two 1996 World Intellectual Property Organisation (WIPO) Internet Treaties: the WIPO Copyright Treaty and the WIPO Performances and Phonograms Treaty. Two other WIPO Treaties signed in 2012 and 2016, are the Beijing Treaty on the Protection of Audiovisual Performances and the Marrakesh VIP Treaty to Facilitate Access to Published Works for Persons who are Blind, Visually Impaired or otherwise Print Disabled. Moreover, free-trade agreements, which the EU concluded with a large number of third countries, reflect many provisions of EU law.

=== Digital Services Act & Digital Markets Act (2023) ===
In 2022 the European Parliament did adopt landmark laws for internet platforms, the new rules will improve internet consumer protection and supervision of online platforms, the Digital Services Act (DSA) and the Digital Markets Act (DMA).

== Debates around Internet law ==
The law that regulates aspects of the Internet must be considered in the context of the geographic scope of the technical infrastructure of Internet and state borders that are crossed in processing data around the globe. The global structure of the Internet raises not only jurisdictional issues, that is, the authority to make and enforce laws affecting the Internet, but made corporations and scholars raise questions concerning the nature of the laws themselves.

In their essay "Law and Borders – The Rise of Law in Cyberspace", from 2008, David R. Johnson and David G. Post argue that territorially-based law-making and law-enforcing authorities find this new environment deeply threatening and give a scientific voice to the idea that became necessary for the Internet to govern itself. Instead of obeying the laws of a particular country, "Internet citizens" will obey the laws of electronic entities like service providers. Instead of identifying as a physical person, Internet citizens will be known by their usernames or email addresses (or, more recently, by their Facebook accounts). Over time, suggestions that the Internet can be self-regulated as being its own trans-national "nation" are being supplanted by a multitude of external and internal regulators and forces, both governmental and private, at many different levels. The nature of Internet law remains a legal paradigm shift, very much in the process of development.

=== Lawrence Lessig (1999) ===
Lawrence Lessig, in his 1999 book Code and Other Laws of Cyberspace, identified four primary forces or modes of regulation of the Internet derived from a socioeconomic theory referred to as Pathetic dot theory:

1. Law: What Lessig calls "Standard East Coast Code", from laws enacted by government in Washington D.C. Lessig presents this as the most self-evident of the four modes of regulation. As the numerous United States statutes, codes, regulations, and evolving case law make clear, many actions on the Internet are already subject to conventional laws, both with regard to transactions conducted on the Internet and content posted. Areas like gambling, child pornography, and fraud are regulated in very similar ways online as off-line. While one of the most controversial and unclear areas of evolving laws is the determination of what forum has subject matter jurisdiction over activity (economic and other) conducted on the internet, particularly as cross border transactions affect local jurisdictions, substantial portions of internet activity are subject to traditional regulation, and that conduct that is unlawful off-line is presumptively unlawful online, and subject to traditional enforcement of similar laws and regulations.
2. Architecture: What Lessig calls "West Coast Code", from the programming code of the Silicon Valley. These mechanisms concern the parameters of how information can and cannot be transmitted across the Internet. Everything from internet filtering software (which searches for keywords or specific URLs and blocks them before they can even appear on the computer requesting them), to encryption programs, to the very basic architecture of TCP/IP protocols and user interfaces falls within this category of mainly private regulation. It is arguable that all other modes of internet regulation either rely on, or are significantly affected by, West Coast Code.
3. Norms: As in all other modes of social interaction, conduct is regulated by social norms and conventions in significant ways. While certain activities or kinds of conduct online may not be specifically prohibited by the code architecture of the Internet, or expressly prohibited by traditional governmental law, nevertheless these activities or conduct are regulated by the standards of the community in which the activity takes place, in this case internet "users". Just as certain patterns of conduct will cause an individual to be ostracized from our real world society, so too certain actions will be censored or self-regulated by the norms of whatever community one chooses to associate with on the internet.
4. Markets: Closely allied with regulation by social norms, markets also regulate certain patterns of conduct on the Internet. While economic markets will have limited influence over non-commercial portions of the Internet, the Internet also creates a virtual marketplace for information, and such information affects everything from the comparative valuation of services to the traditional valuation of stocks. In addition, the increase in popularity of the Internet as a means for transacting all forms of commercial activity, and as a forum for advertisement, has brought the laws of supply and demand to cyberspace. Market forces of supply and demand also affect connectivity to the Internet, the cost of bandwidth, and the availability of software to facilitate the creation, posting, and use of internet content.

These forces or regulators of the Internet do not act independently of each other. For example, governmental laws may be influenced by greater societal norms, and markets affected by the nature and quality of the code that operates a particular system.

=== Net neutrality ===
Another major area of interest is net neutrality, which affects the regulation of the infrastructure of the Internet. Though not obvious to most Internet users, every packet of data sent and received by every user on the Internet passes through routers and transmission infrastructure owned by a collection of private and public entities, including telecommunications companies, universities, and governments. This issue has been handled in the past for electrical telegraph, telephone and cable TV. A critical aspect is that laws in force in one jurisdiction have the potential to have effects in other jurisdictions when host servers or telecommunications companies are affected. The Netherlands became in 2013 the first country in Europe and the second in the world, after Chile, to pass law relating to it. In the U.S., on 12 March 2015, the FCC released the specific details of its new net neutrality rule. On 13 April 2015, the FCC published the final rule on its new regulations.

=== Free speech on the Internet ===
Article 19 of the Universal Declaration of Human Rights calls for the protection of free opinion and expression. Which includes right such as freedom to hold opinions without interference and to seek, receive and impart information and ideas through any media and regardless of frontiers.

In comparison to print-based media, the accessibility and relative anonymity of internet has lowered traditional barriers to publication. Any person with an internet connection has the potential to reach an audience of millions. These complexities have taken many forms, three notable examples being the Jake Baker incident, in which the limits of obscene Internet postings were at issue, the controversial distribution of the DeCSS code, and Gutnick v Dow Jones, in which libel laws were considered in the context of online publishing. The last example illustrated the complexities inherent to applying one country's laws to the international nature of the internet. In 2003, Jonathan Zittrain considered this issue in his paper, "Be Careful What You Ask For: Reconciling a Global Internet and Local Law".

In the UK in 2006 the case of Keith-Smith v Williams confirmed that existing libel laws applied to internet discussions.

In terms of the tort liability of ISPs and hosts of internet forums, Section 230(c) of the Communications Decency Act may provide immunity in the United States.

=== Internet censorship ===
In many countries, speech through ICT has proven to be another means of communication which has been regulated by the government. The "Open Net Initiative" by the Harvard University Berkman Klein Center, the University of Toronto and the Canadian SecDev Group whose mission statement is "to investigate and challenge state filtration and surveillance practices" to "...generate a credible picture of these practices," has released numerous reports documenting the filtration of internet-speech in various countries. While China has thus far (2011) proven to be the most rigorous in its attempts to filter unwanted parts of the internet from its citizens, many other countries – including Singapore, Iran, Saudi Arabia, and Tunisia – have engaged in similar practices of Internet censorship. In one of the most vivid examples of information control, the Chinese government for a short time transparently forwarded requests to the Google search engine to its own, state-controlled search engines.

These examples of filtration bring to light many underlying questions concerning the freedom of speech. For example, do government have a legitimate role in limiting access to information? And if so, what forms of regulation are acceptable? For example, some argue that the blocking of "blogspot" and other websites in India failed to reconcile the conflicting interests of speech and expression on the one hand and legitimate government concerns on the other hand.

== Development of U.S. privacy law ==
=== Warren and Brandeis ===
At the close of the 19th century, public concern about privacy grew, leading to the 1890 publication of Samuel Warren and Louis Brandeis "The Right to Privacy". The vitality of this article can be seen today, when examining the USSC decision of Kyllo v. United States, 533 U.S. 27 (2001) where it is cited by the majority, those in concurrence, and even those in dissent.

The motivation of both authors to write such an article is heavily debated amongst scholars, however, two developments during this time give some insight to the reasons behind it. First, the sensationalistic press and the concurrent rise and use of "yellow journalism" to promote the sale of newspapers in the time following the Civil War brought privacy to the forefront of the public eye. The other reason that brought privacy to the forefront of public concern was the technological development of "instant photography". This article influenced subsequent privacy legislation during the 20th and 21st centuries.

=== Reasonable Expectation of Privacy Test and emerging technology ===
In 1967, the United States Supreme Court decision in Katz v United States, 389 U.S. 347 (1967) established what is known as the Reasonable Expectation of Privacy Test to determine the applicability of the Fourth Amendment in a given situation. The test was not noted by the majority, but instead it was articulated by the concurring opinion of Justice Harlan. Under this test, 1) a person must exhibit an "actual (subjective) expectation of privacy" and 2) "the expectation [must] be one that society is prepared to recognize as 'reasonable'".

=== Privacy Act of 1974 ===
Inspired by the Watergate scandal, the United States Congress enacted the Privacy Act of 1974 just four months after the resignation of then President Richard Nixon. In passing this Act, Congress found that "the privacy of an individual is directly affected by the collection, maintenance, use, and dissemination of personal information by Federal agencies" and that "the increasing use of computers and sophisticated information technology, while essential to the efficient operations of the Government, has greatly magnified the harm to individual privacy that can occur from any collection, maintenance, use, or dissemination of personal information".

=== Foreign Intelligence Surveillance Act of 1978 ===
Codified at 50 U.S.C. §§ 1801–1811, this act establishes standards and procedures for use of electronic surveillance to collect "foreign intelligence" within the United States. §1804(a)(7)(B). FISA overrides the Electronic Communications Privacy Act during investigations when foreign intelligence is "a significant purpose" of said investigation. 50 U.S.C. § 1804(a)(7)(B) and §1823(a)(7)(B). Another interesting result of FISA is the creation of the Foreign Intelligence Surveillance Court (FISC). All FISA orders are reviewed by this special court of federal district judges. The FISC meets in secret, with all proceedings usually also held from both the public eye and those targets of the desired surveillance.

=== (1986) Electronic Communication Privacy Act ===
The ECPA represents an effort by the United States Congress to modernize federal wiretap law. The ECPA amended Title III (see: Omnibus Crime Control and Safe Streets Act of 1968) and included two new acts in response to developing computer technology and communication networks. Thus the ECPA in the domestic venue into three parts: 1) Wiretap Act, 2) Stored Communications Act, and 3) The Pen Register Act.

- Types of Communication
  - Wire Communication: Any communication containing the human voice that travels at some point across a wired medium such as radio, satellite or cable.
  - Oral Communication:
  - Electronic Communication
1. The Wiretap Act: For Information see Wiretap Act
2. The Stored Communications Act: For information see Stored Communications Act
3. The Pen Register Act: For information see Pen Register Act

=== (1994) Driver's Privacy Protection Act ===
The DPPA was passed in response to states selling motor vehicle records to private industry. These records contained personal information such as name, address, phone number, SSN, medical information, height, weight, gender, eye color, photograph and date of birth. In 1994, Congress passed the Driver's Privacy Protection (DPPA), 18 U.S.C. §§ 2721–2725, to cease this activity.

=== (1999) Gramm-Leach-Bliley Act ===
This act authorizes widespread sharing of personal information by financial institutions such as banks, insurers, and investment companies. The GLBA permits sharing of personal information between companies joined or affiliated as well as those companies unaffiliated. To protect privacy, the act requires a variety of agencies such as the SEC, FTC, etc. to establish "appropriate standards for the financial institutions subject to their jurisdiction" to "insure security and confidentiality of customer records and information" and "protect against unauthorized access" to this information. 15 U.S.C. § 6801

=== (2002) Homeland Security Act ===
Passed by Congress in 2002, the Homeland Security Act, 6 U.S.C. § 222, consolidated 22 federal agencies into what is commonly known today as the Department of Homeland Security (DHS). The HSA, also created a Privacy Office under the DoHS. The Secretary of Homeland Security must "appoint a senior official to assume primary responsibility for privacy policy." This privacy official's responsibilities include but are not limited to: ensuring compliance with the Privacy Act of 1974, evaluating "legislative and regulatory proposals involving the collection, use, and disclosure of personal information by the Federal Government", while also preparing an annual report to Congress.

=== (2004) Intelligence Reform and Terrorism Prevention Act ===
This Act mandates that intelligence be "provided in its most shareable form" that the heads of intelligence agencies and federal departments "promote a culture of information sharing." The IRTPA also sought to establish protection of privacy and civil liberties by setting up a five-member Privacy and Civil Liberties Oversight Board. This Board offers advice to both the President of the United States and the entire executive branch of the Federal Government concerning its actions to ensure that the branch's information sharing policies are adequately protecting privacy and civil liberties.

== See also ==
- Berkman Center for Internet & Society
- Bernstein v. United States and Junger v. Daley – on free speech protection of software
- Computer forensics
- Computer crime
- Cultural lag
- Data localization
- Digital Millennium Copyright Act (DMCA)
- Electronic Communications Privacy Act
- Export of cryptography
- Glossary of legal terms in technology
- Software patent debate
- Universal v. Reimerdes – test of DMCA
- Ouellette v. Viacom International Inc. (DMCA and ADA)
- Wassenaar Arrangement
- Doe v. 2themart.com Inc. – First Amendment right to speak anonymously
- United States v. Ivanov – Applying United States cyber-law to a foreign national operating outside the US

Centers and groups for the study of cyberlaw and related areas

- Berkman Center for Internet and Society at Harvard Law School
- Centre for Internet and Society, in Bangalore, India.
- Institute for Information, Telecommunication and Media Law in Münster, Germany
- Institute of Space and Telecommunications Law (IDEST) at University of Paris-Sud, Master's degree in Space Activities and Telecommunications Law
- Norwegian Research Center for Computers and Law
- Stanford Center for Internet and Society, at Stanford Law School

Topics related to cyberlaw

- Copyright, especially the Digital Millennium Copyright Act in the United States, and similar laws in other countries
- Cyber defamation law
- Digital rights management
- Intellectual property
- Internet censorship
- Stop Online Piracy Act
- Spamming
