= Critical Metrics =

- Website type: Professional Reviews/Ratings of Entertainment Media
- Owner: Critical Metrics LLC.
- Creator: Joseph Anuff
- Commercial: Yes
- Registration: Free/Subscription
- Launched: March 2007
- Current status: defunct

Critical Metrics was a web-based music recommendation service. Unlike user-driven sites like The Hype Machine and Pandora, Critical Metrics featured only expert-generated content. Aggregating reviews and playlists from over 150 publications, both print and online, the site also encompassed historical sources. The site then ranked the songs mathematically, based on the information gathered. With a methodology based in the fields of bibliometrics and sentiment analysis, Critical Metrics quantified these positive citations and sentiments into indices for media playlisting and consumption.

Streaming audio and YouTube videos were presented with the original recommendations, along with the option to purchase via iTunes or other online retailers. When the site was launched in April 2007, it hosted the streaming music itself. A licensing arrangement with Rhapsody removed the free music, but allowed unlimited listening and playlist-building for Rhapsody subscribers.

Critical Metrics was founded by Joey Anuff, the co-founder of Suck.com and a former VH1 executive. The site was praised by Boing Boing, The Wall Street Journal, and Business Week. Los Angeles Times senior music critic Ann Powers referred to the site as her "favorite snobby top 40 station".

== Recognition ==
- Michael Arrington, Kevin Werbach (June 2007). "Supernova 2007 - "Connected Innovators"". TechCrunch.
- Rafe Needleman (March 2008). "Webware 100 finalists". CNET. Archived from the original on 2008-10-14.

== Website shutdown ==
The website is now shut down and defunct.
