= Harvard Law Record =

Student newspaper of Harvard Law School

The Harvard Law Record
- Type: Student newspaper
- Owner: The Harvard Law School Record Corporation
- Founded: 1946
- Headquarters: Cambridge, Massachusetts
- Website: harvardlawrecord.com

The Harvard Law Record is an independent student-edited newspaper based at Harvard Law School. Founded in 1946, it is the oldest law school newspaper in the United States.

== Characteristics ==
The Record, a print and online publication, includes law school news, world and national news, and scholarly articles and op-eds written by Harvard Law School students and professors, as well as outside contributors. It should not be confused with the Harvard Law Review, which is limited to publishing scholarly academic articles exclusively.

Although it is student-run, the Record is owned by the Harvard Law School Record Corporation, an independent non-profit organization funded primarily through donations. It does not receive much funding or substantial support from the law school. The paper operates out of a basement in the Harvard Law School dorms.

The Record is home to fictional law student Fenno, who since the 1950s has satirically chronicled the adventures of an anonymous law student, and has lampooned prominent members of the Harvard Law School community in the process. It also publishes an annual April Fool's Day issue, renowned for its satire.

== History ==
The Record was founded in 1946 by a group of returning World War II veterans who were unhappy with conditions at the School, particularly a lack of student housing. The three primary founders of the Record were Charles O. Porter, who later served as a U.S. Congressman from Oregon, Charles Sweet, later a judge, and Paul Hellmuth, who became managing partner of the Boston law firm Hale & Dorr (now WilmerHale).

Among the former editors of the Record is Ralph Nader, who published his first article on unsafe conditions in the auto industry entitled, "American Cars: Designed for Death", in the Record in 1958. The article was later expanded into Nader's seminal work on the subject, Unsafe at Any Speed. After a year in which the Record ceased publishing, Ralph Nader worked with a law student, Michael Shammas, to revive the paper for the 2015–2016 academic year.

In 1959, Nader and co-editor David Binder traveled to Cuba to report on the Cuban Revolution in the Record, which coverage included an exclusive interview with Fidel Castro.

Also in 1959, William H. Rehnquist, then a young Arizona lawyer, wrote an editorial in the Record entitled "The Making of a Supreme Court Justice," in which he criticized the U.S. Senate for not questioning the judicial philosophy of Supreme Court nominees. The article was later cited by members of the Senate Judiciary Committee when he refused to answer questions during his confirmation hearings.

In April 1971, The New York Times reported that Harvard Law School professors Alan Dershowitz and Paul Freund had quit after picking up the story from the Record's April Fool's Day issue.

In the 21st century, the Record has won several awards from the American Bar Association Law Student Division for outstanding writing, including the 2007 awards for Best Editorial and Best Feature Article. Although the print edition briefly paused circulating in 2012, in 2013 Harvard Law students Sima Atri and Michael Shammas revamped the paper with the guidance of former editor-in-chief Ralph Nader. The newspaper has an active staff of law students and routinely publishes articles by professors and law students around the country. In the 2015-2016 year, with Michael Shammas as editor-in-chief and Lindsay Church as co-editor-in-chief, the paper published stories that were referenced in The New York Times, American Lawyer, Jerusalem Post, The Washington Post, The Wall Street Journal, The Boston Globe, and other national and international news organizations. The paper also won the American Bar Association's 2016 "Best Law School Newspaper" Award.

In addition to its print edition, the Record operates a website.

== Notable editors and contributors ==
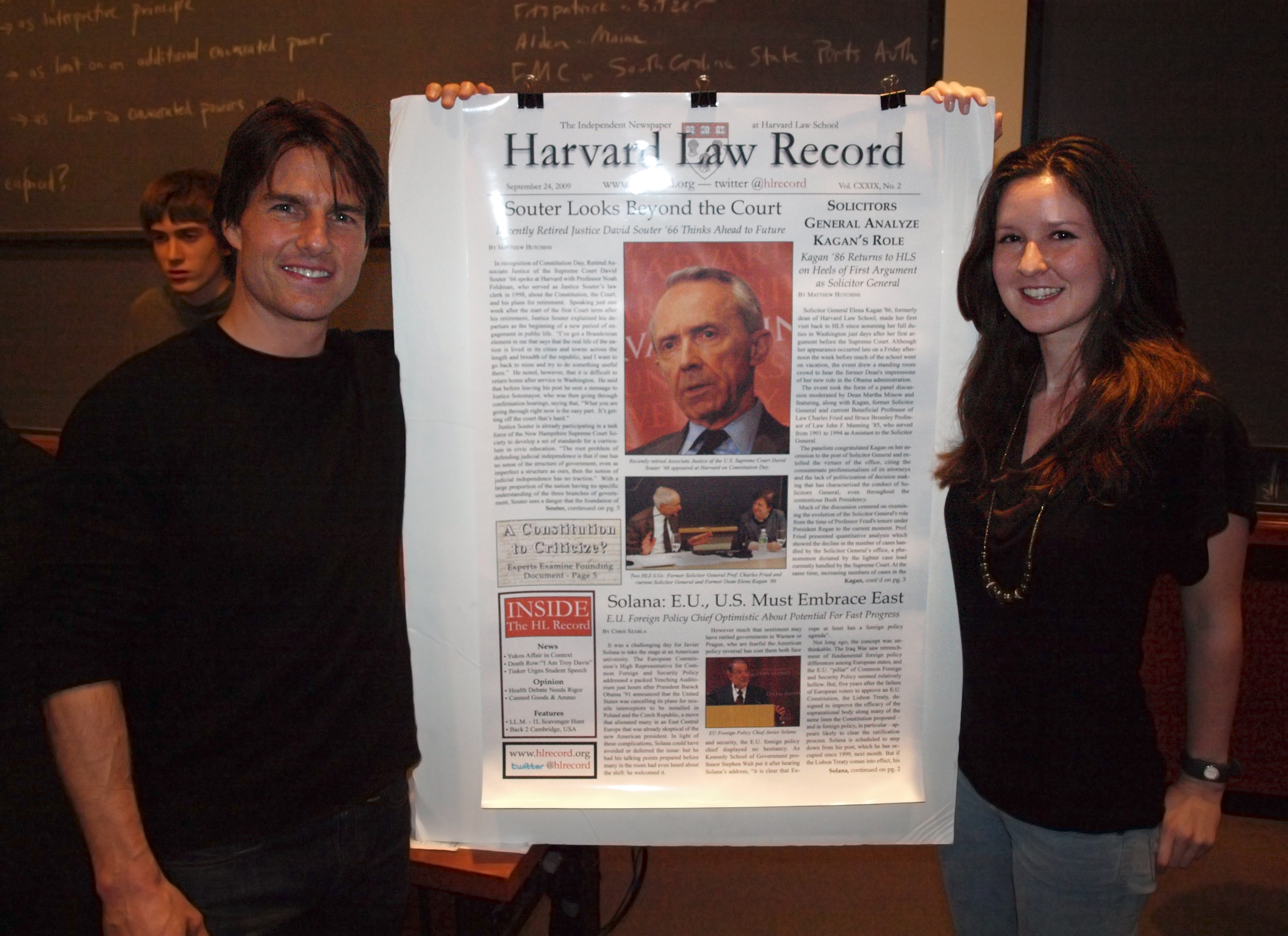
Actor Tom Cruise poses with a poster of the Record front page and with Record editor Jessica Corsi during a visit to Harvard Law School on October 5, 2009.

- Jacob M. Appel, fiction writer and bioethicist
- Derrick Bell, law professor at NYU Law School
- Jeremy Blachman, author of the Anonymous Lawyer blog and books
- Alexander Boldizar, novelist and art critic
- Ruben Bolling, a.k.a. Ken Fisher, cartoonist and creator of Tom the Dancing Bug
- Alan Dershowitz, law professor and author
- Debra Dickerson, author and commentator
- Robert Fellmeth, public interest law professor at the University of San Diego Law School
- Robert Flanders, Rhode Island Supreme Court Justice
- Martin D. Ginsburg, tax law expert at Georgetown University Law School
- Philip Heymann, Deputy Attorney General under Bill Clinton and currently professor at Harvard Law
- Ricardo Hinojosa, federal district court judge
- D. Brock Hornby, federal district court judge
- Murad Kalam, O. Henry Award winning novelist
- Duncan Kennedy, law professor at Harvard Law School and a founder of Critical Legal Studies.
- George N. Leighton, U.S. District Court judge for the Northern District of Illinois
- James Alan McPherson, Pulitzer Prize-winning essayist and short story writer
- Johanes Maliza, professional soccer player
- Jamie Metzl, Executive Vice President of the Asia Society and former State Department official
- Patrick Miles Jr., 2010 Michigan congressional candidate
- Makau Mutua, former Dean of the University at Buffalo Law School
- Ralph Nader, consumer advocate and U.S. presidential candidate
- Charles Ogletree, law professor
- Barack Obama, President of the United States
- Joel Pollak, 2010 Illinois congressional candidate
- Charles O. Porter, U.S. Representative from Oregon
- Richard Posner, federal circuit court judge and law professor at the University of Chicago
- Samantha Power, Pulitzer Prize-winning journalist, and former United States Ambassador to the United Nations
- William Rehnquist, Chief Justice of the United States
- Henry Stern, member of the New York City Council and Commissioner of New York City Parks and Recreation
- Jerome J. Shestack, former American Bar Association president
- James B. Stewart, journalist, Pulitzer Prize-winning author
- Kevin Werbach, business and technology expert at the Wharton School

== See also ==
- The Harvard Crimson, Harvard's undergraduate newspaper
- Harvard Law Review, a student-edited academic journal
- The Harvard Lampoon, undergraduate newspaper
- Harvard Association for Law & Business, law school student organization
