= Alexey Ivanov =

Alexei or Alexey Ivanov may refer to:

== Sports ==
- Aleksei Ivanov (footballer, born 1981), Russian footballer with FC Saturn Moscow Oblast
- Alexei Ivanov (ice hockey, born 1985), Russian ice hockey player drafted by the NHL Chicago Blackhawks
- Alexei Ivanov (ice hockey, born 1988), Kazakh ice hockey goaltender
- Alexey Ivanov (athlete), Russian Paralympic track and field athlete
- Aliaksei Ivanou (born 1980), Belarusian skier

== Others ==
- Alexei Ivanov (writer) (born 1969), Russian writer
- Aleksei Ivanovich Ivanov (1878–1937), Russian sinologist and tangutologist
- Alexei Ivanov (serial killer) (born 1979), Russian serial killer
- Aleksey Vladimirovich Ivanov, defendant in the US case United States v. Ivanov
