= Gigi Sohn =

American attorney (born 1961)

Gigi B. Sohn
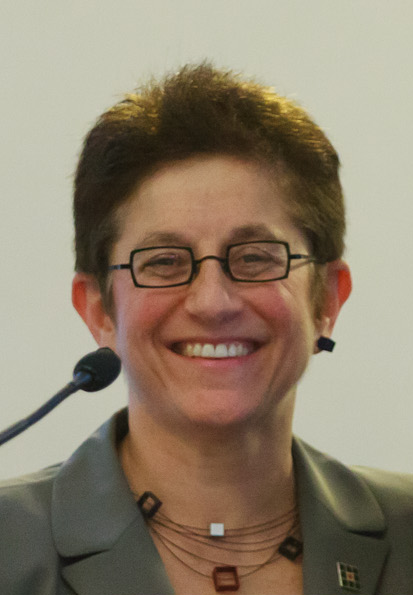
- Sohn in 2012
- Born: August 2, 1961 (age 65)
- Education: Boston University (BS); University of Pennsylvania (JD)
- Spouse: Lara Ballard (m. 2007)
- Children: 1

Gigi Beth Sohn (born August 2, 1961) is an American lawyer who is the co-founder (with Laurie Racine and David Bollier) of Public Knowledge. She previously worked for the Ford Foundation. In 2013, Tom Wheeler hired her into a senior staff position at the U.S. Federal Communications Commission (FCC). She left there shortly after Donald Trump's election in 2016. In July 2017, she held fellowship positions with Georgetown Law's Institute for Technology Law & Policy, Open Society Foundations, and Mozilla.

== Early life and education ==
Sohn earned a Bachelor of Science degree in broadcasting and film from Boston University, and a Juris Doctor from the University of Pennsylvania Law School.

== Career ==
From 2013 to 2016, Gigi served as Counselor to Former FCC Chairman Tom Wheeler, and from 2001 to 2013 was co-founder and CEO of Public Knowledge, a communications and technology policy advocacy organization serving the interests of consumers. She was previously a Project Specialist in the Ford Foundation’s Media, Arts and Culture unit and Executive Director of the Media Access Project, a communications public interest law firm.

She is a non-resident fellow at the University of Southern California Annenberg Center, and a Senior Fellow at the University of Melbourne Faculty of Law. She has been an adjunct professor at Georgetown University and at the Benjamin N. Cardozo School of Law. She is known for her "personal relationships with power players all over the capital."

Sohn is an EFF Pioneer Award winner. In November 2013, she was hired by the FCC as special counsel for external affairs. Sohn is the host of Tech on the Rocks, a podcast focused on media, tech policy and broadband.

From 2018 to 2021, Sohn sat on the board of Sports Fan Coalition, doing business as Locast, an app that captured and retransmitted local broadcast signals over the internet pursuant to an exemption in the copyright law for nonprofits. Viewers could stream the content for free, though it accepted donations. The service was taken down as the result of a copyright lawsuit brought by the owners of the major television networks.

Since 2018, Sohn has been a member of the Board of the Electronic Frontier Foundation.

=== FCC nomination ===
Sohn's FCC confirmation hearing; February 14, 2023

On October 26, 2021, President Joe Biden nominated Sohn to serve as a commissioner of the Federal Communications Commission. While supported by Senate Democrats, Sohn's nomination was opposed by Republicans, alleging that she would censor conservative speech, and claiming her past involvement in Locast was a conflict of interest. The Wall Street Journal editorial board additionally criticized her opposition to the acquisition of Tribune Media by Sinclair Broadcast Group. Contrarily, Sohn was endorsed by Chris Ruddy and Robert Harring—the heads of the conservative news channels Newsmax and One America News Network (OANN)—for policy positions on media diversity deemed favorable to independent broadcasters.

Sohn faced intense lobbying and astroturfing efforts from the telecom industry, including groups with reported ties such as the League of United Latin American Citizens,Heidi Heitkamp's Democratic PAC One Country Project (which cited inconsistent commitments to rural broadband, and was alleged to have been paid by Comcast in an attempt to flip moderate Democrats), and the Fraternal Order of Police (which criticized her support of police reform).

Initial hearings were held before the Senate Commerce Committee on her nomination on December 1, 2021. Sohn's initial nomination stalled in the committee and was returned to Biden on January 3, 2022, after which she was renominated. The committee held a second round of hearings to examine Sohn's nomination on February 9, 2022, with a focus on a previously-undisclosed settlement by Locast that was signed a day after her original nomination was announced. This second hearing fell outside the normal process for re-nomination, which typically does not involve a second hearing. On March 3, 2022, the committee deadlocked on the nomination in a party-line vote. The entire Senate failed to move her out of committee on a discharge petition.

On January 3, 2023, at the conclusion of the 117th Congress, her nomination was again returned to the White House and Sohn was again re-nominated for the post. Commerce Committee Chair Maria Cantwell described the lobbying campaigns against Sohn as being a "proxy fight for net neutrality", while veteran television executive Preston Padden (who worked with Sohn and Rupert Murdoch on regulatory matters for Fox) warned that she was ”in danger of falling victim to the worst, and most cynical and baseless smear campaign ever waged against a nominee to serve on the FCC." Consumer Technology Association (CTA) president Gary J. Shapiro suspected that the deadlock was the result of homophobia, as Sohn would have been the first FCC commissioner to be openly gay.

On February 14, 2023, the Commerce Committee held a third nomination hearing. On March 7, Sohn withdrew her nomination, citing extensive lobbying and "unrelenting, dishonest and cruel attacks" against her.

=== American Association for Public Broadband ===
In May 2023, Sohn became executive director of the newly formed American Association for Public Broadband which represents community-owned broadband networks and co-ops.

== Personal life ==
Sohn married Lara Ballard in August 2007.
