= Harvard Association for Law & Business =

Student organization

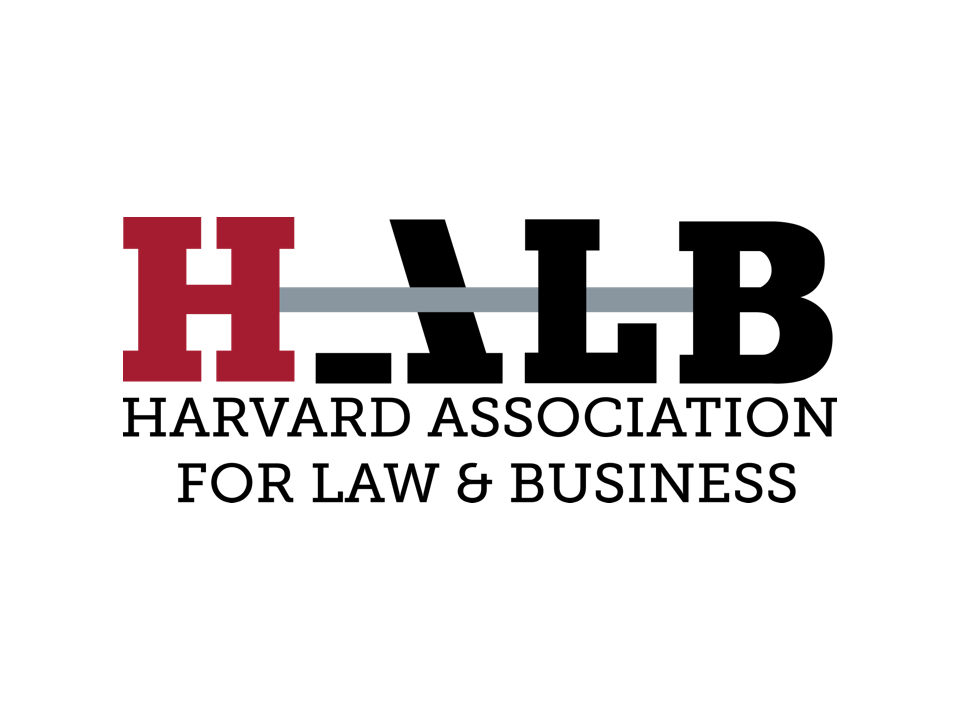
- Abbreviation: HALB
- Formation: 2006
- Type: Harvard Law School student organization
- Legal status: Non-Profit
- Purpose: Exploring the intersection of law and business
- Headquarters: Cambridge, Massachusetts
- Location: 1585 Massachusetts Ave., Cambridge, MA 02138
- Region served: United States
- Presidents: Bobby Pedersen & Tyler Windsor
- Website: orgs.law.harvard.edu/halb/

The Harvard Association for Law & Business (or HALB) is a student organization at Harvard Law School that connects students with business leaders.

== Overview ==
HALB hosts panels and events that explore issues in the business world, especially as they intersect with the law. The organization also creates opportunities for members to meet like-minded students and practitioners and supports HLS students who are interested in non-legal business careers.

For instance, 2015-16 President, Alexander Rienzie, hosted fireside chats with Skybridge Capital Founder, Anthony Scaramucci, and former Pfizer CEO, Jeff Kindler, among others. In past years, HALB hosted panels featuring Vinson & Elkins, Burford Capital, Simpson Thacher & Bartlett, The Carlyle Group, Silverwood, K&L Gates, and Sullivan & Cromwell, among many others.

== Notable Speakers ==
Bill Ackman, Stephen Schwarzman, Tony West, Xiqing Gao, Seth Klarman, Paul Singer, Christa Quarles, Alexandra Lebenthal, Gerald Storch, Nigel Travis, Michael Chae, Barry Volpert, Brad Singer, Robert Crowley, Amanda Bradford, Larry Summers, Mitch Julis, Douglas Braunstein, Jane Levine, Howard Brownstein, Kim Koopersmith, Jami Wintz McKeon, Joseph Shenker, Jim Koch, Matt Mallow, Scott Hoffman, John Finley, Hilary Krane, Michelle Rowdy, Tim Murphy, Rob Chesnut, Phil Rothenberg, Louise Pentland, Matt Long, Susanne Clark, Chad Ho, Sydney Brie Schaub, Danforth Townley, Erin Abrams, Jonathan Truppman, Maureen Sherry, Stacy Selig, Munib Islam, Jeff Gramm, Billy Gonzalez, Andrew Kaplan, Lisa Marrone, Kevin Bueller, Alec Stern, Jordan French, Samuel Flax, Suzanne Wilson Connie Matteo, Al Togut, Tom Hardin, Weiwei Hua, Min-Amy Xu, Hao Fu, Josh Ostrovsky ("The Fat Jewish"), Mark Cuban, Rich Paul, Steve Kerr, etc.

== See also ==
- Harvard Law Record
- Harvard Law Review
- Harvard Law and Policy Review
- Harvard International Law Journal
- Harvard Journal on Legislation
- Harvard Business Law Review
