= United States v. Alkhabaz =

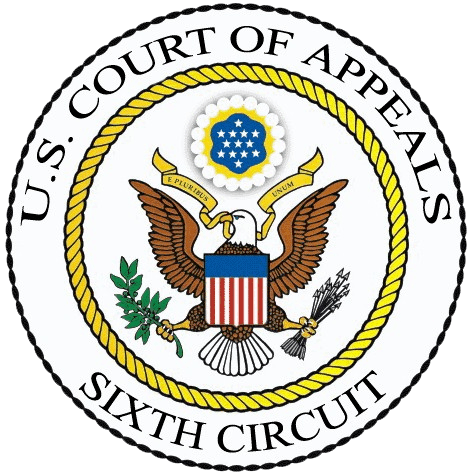
- Court: United States Court of Appeals for the Sixth Circuit
- Full case name: United States of America v. Abraham Jacob Alkhabaz, also known as Jake Baker
- Decided: January 29, 1997
- Citation: 104 F.3d 1492

Case history
- Prior actions: Case dismissed by the United States District Court, E.D. Michigan, Southern Division

Case opinions
- Majority: Chief Judge Boyce F. Martin, Jr., Martha Craig Daughtrey; Dissent: Circuit Judge Robert B. Krupansky

United States v. Alkhabaz, 104 F.3d 1492 (6th Cir. 1997) was a case brought against University of Michigan undergraduate Abraham Jacob Alkhabaz, a.k.a. Jake Baker, related to several incidents regarding snuff stories that he wrote while he was a student at the University of Michigan. Alkhabaz was charged with violation of 18 U.S.C. s 875(c), communicating via interstate or foreign commerce threats to kidnap or injure another person. The case raised immediate First Amendment concerns and is considered an important one in the history of cyber law.

== Background ==
Jake Baker (born March 1974; given name Abraham Jacob Alkhabaz) was a student at the University of Michigan College of Literature, Science, and Arts.

In October 1994, Jake Baker started submitting pornographic stories depicting fantasies of rape, torture, and murder to the alt.sex.stories Usenet group. On January 9, 1995, Baker submitted a story to alt.sex.stories detailing a fantasy about the rape, torture, and murder of one of his classmates using her real name; the prosecution and both the district court and appellate court used the pseudonym "Jane Doe" to protect her privacy. Baker's story was brought to the attention of University of Michigan authorities and he was arrested, determined to be a threat to the subject of his story as well as the rest of the student population.

During the serving of a search warrant upon Baker's computer, University of Michigan police found several stories depicting rape, torture, and murder genre favored by Baker. They also found emails to a Canadian by the name of Arthur Gonda, depicting rape, torture, and murder. Their communications also began detailing a plan for the two men to meet and enact their fantasies to rape, torture, and murder.

On February 9, 1995, Baker was arrested by the FBI and he was later indicted for six counts of violating 18 U.S.C. § 875(c), which prohibits interstate communications containing threats to kidnap or injure another person. Five of the counts were determined by emails between Baker and Gonda. The sixth count was determined from the story about "Jane Doe."

== Bail hearing ==
The magistrate judge ordered Baker detained as a danger to the community and a United States District Court affirmed his detention. Upon Baker's motion to be released on bond, this Court ordered a psychological evaluation. When the evaluation concluded that Baker posed no threat to the community, this Court ordered Baker's release.

== Case resolution ==
One of the counts - communicating a threat by publishing the story about "Jane Doe" on the Internet - was dropped against Baker. On June 21, 1995, the case against Baker was dismissed by Judge Avern Cohn due to lack of evidence that Baker would actually act out his fantasies. The Government appealed this decision, and on January 29, 1997, the 6th U.S. Court of Appeals upheld the decision of the lower court.

== Controversy ==
Free speech advocates state that the Government violated Jake Baker's First Amendment right to free speech by charging him with a crime for writing stories. Others defended the Government's case by stating that Baker's stories were filth, snuff, and that Baker was intending to act on them.

Baker stated that his stories were created as a form of therapy - so that he could act out his anger in a "harmless", legal way. Baker also stated that he was role playing within his emails to Gonda, and that he did not intend to act on his fantasies.

This case was not only about obscenity and threats, but it was being watched by Internet advocates, namely that his stories were published over a wide medium, and that since the Internet is a medium beyond borders, that state even federal level laws were not able to be applied to it. Baker was charged with communicating a threat over interstate lines - a charge that may have not been able to hold, other than the fact that Baker published his stories and corresponded over the Internet.

It has also been said that this case set a precedent for free speech on the Internet.

== Timeline ==
- January 20, 1995 - DPS officers contact Baker. Baker waives his Miranda rights and admits to writing and posting the stories. DPS officers search Baker's room and account with his permission, finding an unpublished story and the e-mail conversations.
- February 2, 1995 - Michigan University President James Duderstadt suspends Baker on the grounds that he is an immediate threat to the woman named in his story.
- February 9, 1995 - FBI arrests Baker on basis of his stories and e-mail to Gonda. Bail is denied on the belief that he is too dangerous to release, as determined by a judge. Baker charged with violating 18 U.S.C. s 875(c).
- February 10, 1995 - After a detention hearing, Baker is again denied bail by a different judge. A defense appeal for bail bond is denied. Probable cause hearing scheduled for February 17 1995. Baker's lawyer appeals no-bail ruling to 6th Circuit Court in Cincinnati, Ohio.
- February 15, 1995 - Baker indicted by grand jury, negating need for probable cause hearing.
- February 17, 1995 - Baker arraigned, pleads not guilty.
- March 7, 1995 - Baker's bond denied by 6th Circuit Court of Appeals in Cincinnati.
- March 9, 1995 - Baker released on $10,000 bond by Judge Avern Cohn, after a psychological evaluation.
- March 15, 1995 - Baker charge based on story dropped, Baker charged with five counts based on e-mail with Gonda.
- June 21, 1995 - Charges against Baker dismissed in a ruling by Judge Avern Cohn. Cohn cited lack of evidence that Baker would act out his fantasies.
- July 19, 1995 - Government files "notice of intent to appeal" the dismissal of the indictment. Government now has less than 7 months to appeal the ruling.
- November 21, 1995 - Government files appeal of dismissal to the United States Court of Appeals. If the appeal had been successful, the case would have been brought back to the District Court for trial.
- August 16, 1996 - 6th US Circuit Court of Appeals hears the government's appeal.
- January 29, 1997 - The 6th US Circuit Court of Appeals upholds the dismissal of charges against Baker, ruling that the e-mail messages did not constitute a credible threat.

== Cites ==
This case has been cited in various cases regarding free speech protection and the Internet.
