= Johanes Maliza =

American soccer player

Personal details
- Born: September 10, 1981 (age 45) Chicago, Illinois, United States
- Education: Stanford University (AB); Harvard Law School (JD)
Association football career
- Full name: Johanes Maliza, Jr.
- Height: 5 ft 8 in (1.73 m)
- Position: Midfielder
Youth career
- 1999–2002: Stanford Cardinal
Senior career*
| Years | Team | Apps | (Gls) |
| 2003 | San Jose Earthquakes | 0 | (0) |
| 2004–2005 | Puerto Rico Islanders | 42 | (1) |
- * Club domestic league appearances and goals

Johanes Maliza (born September 10, 1981) is an American soccer midfielder who, in 2004 and 2005, played for the Puerto Rico Islanders of the USL First Division. He has since entered politics and law.

== Soccer ==
Maliza attended Latin School of Chicago where he was a Parade Magazine High School All American. He then played his college soccer at Stanford from 1999 to 2002 along with Roger Levesque and Todd Dunivant. On January 17, 2003, the San Jose Earthquakes selected Maliza 46th overall in the 2003 MLS SuperDraft. He suffered a severe right hamstring injury in the early pre-season which prevented him from playing for several months. On May 31, 2003, he finally signed a developmental contract with the Quakes. He failed to see any playing time and was waived in September. He signed with the Islanders in 2004 and retired from playing professionally following the 2005 season.

== Law ==
Following his retirement from soccer, Maliza entered politics and law. He earned his Bachelor of Arts in history from Stanford University in 2003, and his Juris Doctor from Harvard Law School in 2010. Maliza served as an assistant federal public defender in Springfield from 2017 to 2021. In 2006, he worked for the Harold Ford campaign in Knox County, Tennessee. He travelled to Kenya where he worked in the Legal Advice Center. He then entered Harvard Law School where he was selected for a 2008 Chayes Fellowship and wrote for the Harvard Law Record. Johanes’ pro bono work includes immigration, housing, and post-conviction representations in Illinois, Ohio, and other states. For his work representing unaccompanied children and refugees facing religious or other persecution, in 2015 the American Immigration Lawyers Association recognized Johanes and colleagues for outstanding efforts in providing pro bono representation in the immigration field.

On June 11, 2022, Maliza was one of three recommendations made by U.S. senators Dick Durbin & Tammy Duckworth made for a district court seat on the United States District Court for the Central District of Illinois.
