= David R. Johnson =

American lawyer

David R. Johnson is an American lawyer specializing in computer communications. He is a senior fellow at Center for Democracy and Technology, and a former chairman of the Electronic Frontier Foundation.

== Career ==
Johnson graduated from Yale College with a B.A. summa cum laude in 1967. He completed a year of postgraduate study at University College, Oxford in 1968, and earned a J.D. from Yale Law School in 1972. For a year following graduation Johnson clerked for Malcolm R. Wilkey of the United States Court of Appeals for the District of Columbia.

Johnson joined Washington, D.C., law firm Wilmer, Cutler & Pickering in 1973, and became a partner in 1980. His practice focused primarily on the emerging area of electronic commerce, including counseling on issues relating to privacy, domain names and Internet governance issues, jurisdiction, copyright, taxation, electronic contracting, encryption, defamation, ISP and OSP liability, regulation, and other intellectual property matters.

Johnson helped to write the Electronic Communications Privacy Act (1986) Johnson was active in the introduction of personal computers in law practice, acting as president and CEO of Counsel Connect, a system connecting corporate counsel and outside law firms, and serving the board of the Center for Computer-Assisted Legal Instruction (CALI) and as a trustee of the National Center for Automated Information Research (NCAIR).

In 1991 Johnson was a co-founder of the Law Practice Technology Roundtable.

In October 1993, coincidental with the move of its main offices from Cambridge, Massachusetts to D.C., Johnson became a director of the Electronic Frontier Foundation. In February 2005, while serving as the organization's Senior Policy Fellow, Johnson replaced founder Mitch Kapor as chairman of the EFF Board.

Johnson departed Wilmer, Cutler & Pickering in 1995, and in 1996 co-founded the Cyberspace Law Institute with David G. Post. He was involved in discussions leading to the Clinton/Gore Framework for Global Electronic Commerce in 1997. In February 1998 Johnson was appointed as founding director of the Aspen Institute Internet Policy Project.

In the early 2000s, along with Post, Johnson was active in the re-organization of ICANN – penning several critical papers with Susan P. Crawford. In 2006 he collaborated with Crawford in the establishment of OneWebDay.

From 2004 to 2009 Johnson held the post of visiting professor at New York Law School. In May 2009 he commenced a one-year senior fellowship with the Center for Democracy and Technology.

== Writings ==
- Regulation and the Political Process co-authored with Lloyd N. Cutler, 84 Yale Law Journal 1395 (June 1975)
- Law and Borders - The Rise of Law in Cyberspace co-authored with David G. Post, 48 Stanford Law Review 1367 (May 1996) (1997 McGannon Award)
- The Life of the Law Online 51 N.Y.L. SCH. L. REV. 956 (2007) or First Monday, Issue 11–2.
- THE ACCOUNTABLE NET:PEER PRODUCTION OF INTERNET GOVERNANCE w/ Susan P. Crawford, John G. Palfrey, Jr. (Aspen Institute) 2004
