= Internets =

Bushism-turned catchphrase

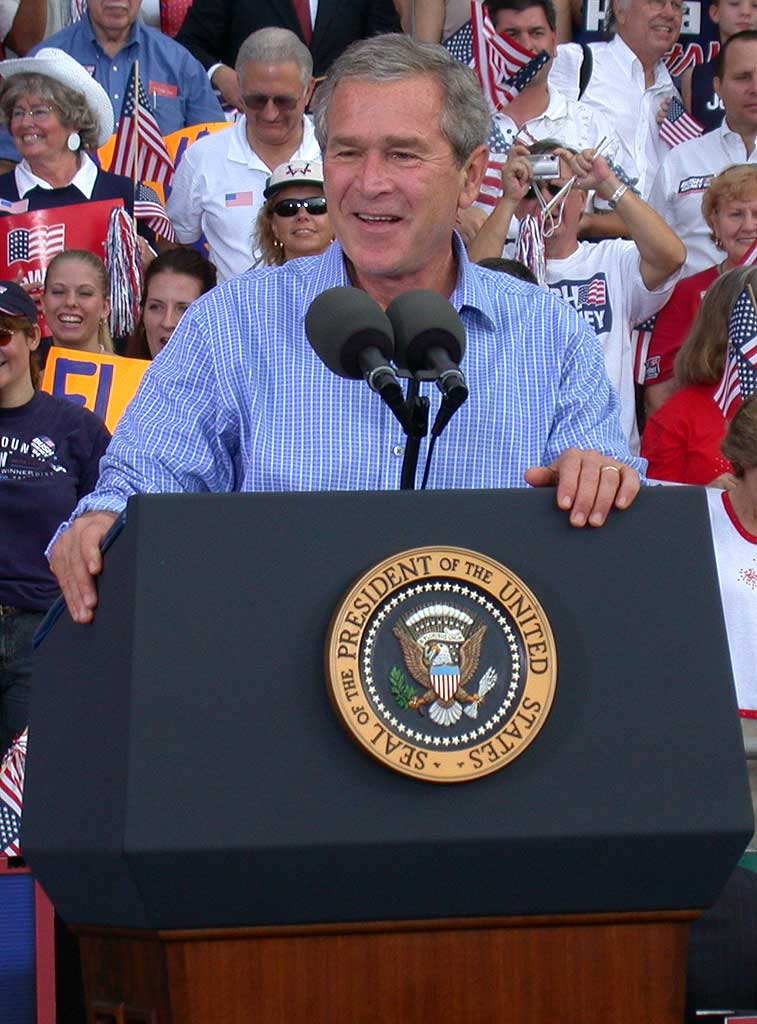
George W. Bush during the 2004 campaign

"Internets", also known as "The Internets", is a Bushism-turned catchphrase used humorously to portray the speaker as ignorant about the Internet or about technology in general, or alternatively as having a provincial or folksy attitude toward technology. Former United States President George W. Bush first used the word publicly during the 2000 election campaign. The term gained cachet as an Internet humor meme following Bush's use of the term in the second 2004 presidential election debate on October 8, 2004.

== Presidential usages ==
Bush used the word Internets^{[a]} in his third presidential debate against Al Gore on October 17, 2000:

JOYCE CLEAMER, AUDIENCE MEMBER: …I'm very concerned about the morality of our country now. TV, movies, the music that our children are, you know, barraged with every day. And I want to know if there's anything that can be worked out with the—Hollywood, or whoever, to help get rid of some of this bad language and whatever, you know...
BUSH: ... You bet there's things that government can do. We can work with the entertainment industry to provide family hour. We can have filters on Internets where public money is spent. There ought to be filters in public libraries and filters in public schools so if kids get on the Internet, there is not going to be pornography or violence coming in.

In the 2004 election's second debate in St. Louis, Missouri, this time opposing John Kerry, Bush used the word Internets^{[a]} in response to an audience question about a potential military draft:

DANIEL FARLEY, AUDIENCE MEMBER: Mr. President, since we continue to police the world, how do you intend to maintain our military presence without reinstituting a draft?
BUSH: Yes, that's a great question. Thanks. I hear there's rumors on the, uh, Internets^{[b]} [pause] that we're going to have a draft. We're not going to have a draft, period. The all-volunteer army works. It works particularly when we pay our troops well. It works when we make sure they've got housing, like we have done in the last military budgets.

^a The word "Internets" as used by Bush is capitalized in the official debate transcript.
^b The official transcript follows the word "Internets" with "(sic)". The transcript also omits the filler word "uh" preceding "Internets". Video footage of the quotation shows the full version.

Bush used Internets for a third time on May 2, 2007:

Information is moving—you know, nightly news is one way, of course, but it's also moving through the blogosphere and through the Internets.

During a discussion on education at a Twitter-themed town hall meeting on July 6, 2011, at the White House, President Barack Obama used the term "Internets" and quickly corrected his statement.

== Reaction ==
On the evening of October 9, 2004, the day following the Bush/Kerry debate, Saturday Night Live parodied Bush with Will Forte's impression of George W. Bush:

I hear there's rumors on the Internets that we're going to have a draft. I don't know how many of these Internets are carrying these rumors, but they're just wrong. I think the problem here may be more of a question of getting rid of the bad Internets and keeping the good Internets. You know, 'cause I think we can all agree … there're just too many Internets.

The Saturday Night Live parody was replayed the following morning on CNN's Inside Politics Sunday. Numerous homages and parodies, most including an audio or video clip from the second 2004 debate, appeared on other humor and entertainment web sites, including YTMND, and spread virally on the Internet.

On his show The Colbert Report, comedian Stephen Colbert consistently referred to "the Internet" as "the Internets". During one episode Colbert's character, also named Stephen Colbert, states,

Last night, as I was surfing the Internets … literally: My backyard wave pool has Wi-Fi …

Keith Olbermann similarly made use of the term during his Oddball segment whenever viral videos are covered. The term continues to appear as a popular topic tag on both technical and political blogs.

== Other use of "internets" ==
In general, an internet (uncapitalized) results from the connection (internetworking) of at least two computer networks by establishing a gateway (router) between them. It is proper to pluralize this term. For example, RFC 1918 refers to "Address Allocation for Private Internets". However, since the establishment of the Internet, this usage has been less common.

A much lesser-known recorded use of "internets" actually preceded Bush's use in the October 17, 2000 debate with Al Gore by about eight months. It appeared in a sketch of the comedy show Upright Citizen's Brigade in the episode entitled "Music", which was aired February 7, 2000. In the sketch, the host of a country-western music TV show tells a guest from New York City that "[t]here's a whole lot of things you can't learn in your fancy books and internets."

In 2010, in a Los Angeles Times interview, author Ray Bradbury (author of Fahrenheit 451), who was distrustful of modern technology, said "We have too many cellphones. We've got too many Internets."

The similar but less subtle term "interweb" has likewise been humorously pluralised – hence "interwebs" and "interwebz".

The possibility of forming the non-existing plural of "internet" is not exclusive to English. In 1999, when the Czech edition of the Metro newspaper ran an open-access poll focusing on a recent online leak of transaction account information, a reader, who identified themselves as 72-year old pensioner Věra Pohlová responded: "Tyhle aféry každého jenom otravují. Já bych všechny ty internety a počítače zakázala" (English: "These affairs only annoy everyone. I would ban all those internets and computers"). The quote has since become popular on Czech internet and is used in the same situations as the English counterpart.

== See also ==
- Series of tubes
