= Captive Audience =

2013 book by Susan P. Crawford

- Author: Susan P. Crawford
- Genre: Non-fiction
- Publisher: Yale University Press
- Publication date: 2013
- Pages: 360 pp.
- ISBN: 978-0300153132

Captive Audience: The Telecom Industry and Monopoly Power in the New Gilded Age is an American non-fiction book by the legal expert Susan P. Crawford.

== Summary ==
It describes high-speed internet access in the United States as essential (like electricity) but currently too slow and too expensive. To enable widespread quality of life and to ensure national competitiveness "most Americans should have access to reasonably priced 1-Gb symmetric fiber-to-the-home networks." Crawford explains why the United States should revise national policy to increase competition in a market currently dominated by Comcast, Verizon Communications, AT&T, and Time Warner Cable. Meanwhile, towns and cities should consider setting up local networks after the example of pioneers such as Lafayette, Louisiana's LUSFiber and Chattanooga, Tennessee's EPB.

== See also ==
- Institute for Local Self-Reliance
- Comcast NBC merger
- Criticism of Comcast
- Federal Communications Commission
- National Broadband Plan (United States)
- Municipal broadband
- Cities with Municipal Wireless Networks
