= Public Knowledge =

American non-profit organization

- Formation: 2001; 25 years ago
- Type: Non-profit organization
- Headquarters: Washington, District of Columbia, U.S.
- Website: publicknowledge.org

Public Knowledge is an American non-profit public interest group based in Washington, D.C. Founded in 2001 by David Bollier, Gigi Sohn, and Laurie Racine, Public Knowledge is primarily involved in the fields of intellectual property law, competition and choice in the digital marketplace, and an open standards/end-to-end internet.

== History ==
Public Knowledge was founded in 2001 by David Bollier, Gigi Sohn, and Laurie Racine. Gigi Sohn served as president and CEO from 2001–2013 and Gene Kimmelman served as president and CEO from 2013–2019. Since 2019, Chris Lewis has served as president and CEO.

Public Knowledge promotes technology policies that benefit the public through many different channels, including the media and social platforms, U.S. Congress, federal agencies, and court and agency filings. The organization also conducts research to propose new legislation, regulations, and recommendations for the ever-expanding digital and technological world. Finally, Public Knowledge frequently publishes blog posts, opinion pieces, and papers to apply their work to current events, and hosts convenings and multimedia resources to educate the public and connect them to policymaking in Washington, DC.

== Board of directors ==
The following individuals are on the board as of March 2023.

- Board chair and senior vice president, Starry, Inc., Virginia Lam Abrams
- Internet Archive director and cofounder Brewster Kahle
- Director of policy, Patreon, Laurent Crenshaw
- CEO and founder, Glen Echo Group, Maura Corbett
- Founding partner of Integrated Solutions Group, Moses Boyd
- General Counsel, Expa, Michal Rosenn
- Founder of Slaiman Consulting LLC, Gary Slaiman
- General manager of Microsoft's global airband initiative, Vickie Robinson
- Principal at LC Public Affairs, Marcus Reese
- Chief investment officer of Connect Humanity, Brian Vo

=== Former members of the board ===
- Michael J. Copps – former FCC commissioner, special adviser to the media and democracy reform initiative at Common Cause
- Andrew McLaughlin – partner, betaworks; cofounder and partner, Higher Ground Labs
- Michael Petricone – senior vice president for government affairs, Consumer Technology Association
- Frank C. Torres, III – director of consumer affairs and senior policy counsel, Microsoft
- Kevin Werbach – professor at the Wharton School, University of Pennsylvania
- Hal Abelson – professor of computer science and engineering, Massachusetts Institute of Technology
- Leah Belsky – vice president of strategic development and associate general counsel, Kaltura
- David Bollier – writer and founder of the Commons Strategies Group
- Hal Bringman – founder and president of NVPR
- Susan P. Crawford – professor, University of Michigan Law School
- Jesse Dylan – founder, Wondros
- Lawrence Lessig – professor of law, Stanford Law School
- Warrington Hudlin – founder, dvRepublic
- Reed Hundt – former chair, Federal Communications Commission
- Joichi Ito – former director, MIT Media Lab
- Laurie Racine – founder, managing director, Startl
- Gigi B. Sohn – founder of Public Knowledge; counselor to former FCC chairman Tom Wheeler
- Jonathan Taplin – adjunct professor, USC Annenberg School for Communication and Journalism
- Kathleen Wallman – president, Wallman Consulting LLC

== Policy areas ==
Public Knowledge focuses on many different issues within the space of technology and media, highlighting the intersection of copyright, telecommunications, and internet law. Its mission statement promises that the public interest group "promotes freedom of expression, an open internet, and access to affordable communications tools and creative works."

The organization has worked in the courts and alongside Congress and government agencies like the Federal Communications Commission and the Federal Trade Commission to advocate for a more open and equitable internet experience. Public Knowledge is known for its nuanced thought analysis and policy proposals, such as its Section 230 principles to protect free expression online, its proposal for a digital regulator, and its alternative frameworks for algorithmic accountability.

As of March 2023, the organization advocates for net neutrality, platform competition, consumer privacy, broadband accessibility and affordability, content moderation, a competitive media landscape, reforming copyright to benefit artists and creators, and reforming spectrum management to help consumers gain wireless access — without losing consumer protections along the way.

Public Knowledge has played a key role in securing broadband privacy rules, net neutrality rules, and expanding spectrum access for unlicensed use. It has also run successful campaigns for issues such as improving internet access in tribal communities and unlock of cell phones. Public Knowledge has led coalitions for efforts such as including broadband funding in the Infrastructure Investment and Jobs Act.

== PKTrains ==
PKTrains is Public Knowledge's public interest advocate training program. It was launched in 2014 with the goal of educating diverse, aspiring public policymakers. It offers early-career fellows and interns an opportunity to work side-by-side with Public Knowledge's lawyers, public interest advocates, and communications professionals to learn how to effectively promote policies that benefit the public. Since its launch, the PKTrains program has trained more than 20 full-time post-graduate fellows and many more student interns, externs, and others passionate about making the world a better place through good policymaking that puts people first.

== See also ==
- Creative Commons
- Digital rights
- Fair use
