= One Web Day =

California Admission Day
- Date: September 22
- Next time: September 22, 2026
- Frequency: annual

One Web Day is an annual day of Internet celebration and awareness held on September 22. The stated goal of founder Susan P. Crawford is for OneWebDay to foster and make visible a global constituency that cares about the future of the Internet.

== History ==
The first OneWebDay was held on September 22, 2006. The idea was created by Susan P. Crawford, who was an ICANN board member at the time, in association with other Internet figures such as Doc Searls, David Weinberger, David R. Johnson, Mary Hodder, and David Isenberg, who would all join the board of what would eventually become a 501(c)(3) corporation – OneWebDay Inc. A website was established and a global network of events promoted. The 2006 OneWebDay's anchor celebration featured speakers Craig Newmark, Scott Heiferman, and Drew Schutte in New York City's Battery Park.

By 2008 OneWebDay had grown to more than 30 international events. In Washington Square Park, New York City, speakers included Crawford, John Perry Barlow, Jonathan Zittrain, Craig Newmark, and Lawrence Lessig.

In May 2009, after founder Crawford had joined the Obama administration, Mitch Kapor took over chairmanship of OneWebDay. It was also announced that funding had been granted by the Ford Foundation. A ning-based organizing network was set up.

In April 2010, it was announced that OneWebDay would "retire its brand" and be folded into a new Mozilla Foundation year-round initiative called Drumbeat.

In August 2010, a number of veterans took over organizing the 2010 event on a volunteer basis. A new website and network was established. Events took place in several cities including New York City, Melbourne, Kolkata, Chennai, London, and Pachuca.

In 2011, the main event was a presentation in New York City by Bob Frankston – "Infrastructure commons – the future of connectivity".

In 2012 the theme of OneWebDay was advancing local content.

In 2013 the theme was accessibility, particularly in remembrance of web-accessibility advocate Cynthia Waddell, who died in April 2013.

In 2014 the OneWebDay theme was Recognizing Core Internet Values, and promoted the viewing of three videos: a TEDx talk by Dave Moskowitz, "The Internet Belongs to Everyone" from the United States State Department, and the Dynamic Coalition on Core Internet Values at the 2014 Internet Governance Forum.

In 2015 the theme is Connecting the Next Billion, aligned with the current IGF Intersessional Program, and promotes the viewing of a speech by Catherine Novelli – 'Connecting The World' at the USA-IGF in July 2015.

In 2016 the theme was again Connecting the Next Billion, this time highlighting a speech by United States Under Secretary for Economic Growth, Energy and the Environment Catherine A. Novelli.

In 2017 the theme was Open The Pipes, about the need for connectivity for Community Networks, and highlights a speech by Internet Society CEO/President Kathy Brown at Mobile World Congress in Shanghai.

In 2018 the theme was, in co-ordination with the Global People's Summit, "Reimagine Humanity: Changing the Status Quo" and promoted participation in a global conversation about ways of achieving the Sustainable Development Goals.
