= LUSFiber =

American telephone service company

LFT Fiber
- Formerly: LUS Fiber
- Type: Municipally Owned (subsidiary of Lafayette Utilities System)
- Industry: FTTH, Telecommunications
- Founded: Lafayette, Louisiana, U.S. 2004
- Headquarters: Lafayette, United States
- Area served: City of Lafayette, areas in Acadia Parish, Evangeline Parish, Iberia Parish, Jefferson Davis Parish, Lafayette Parish, Saint Landry Parish, and Vermillion Parish
- Key people: Michael D. Soileau
- Products: High-speed fiber internet, television, and voice
- Services: Cable television, Broadband Internet, Telephone
- Owner: Lafayette Utilities System
- Parent: Lafayette Utilities System
- Website: http://lftfiber.com/

"LFT Fiber" is a municipally owned subsidiary of Lafayette Utilities System, providing cable television, broadband Internet, and telephone services to the citizens of Lafayette, Louisiana. It is notable for being the first municipally owned company providing Fiber-To-The-Home services in the U.S. state of Louisiana and one of the first municipally owned FTTH companies in the country.

== History ==
In the late 1990s, the Lafayette Utilities System (Lafayette's municipally owned utilities company) needed to upgrade its outdated microwave system for connecting their substations. LUS chose to upgrade with Fiber Optic technology. In 2002, after installing the system for their needs, they used the surplus fiber optic strands to provide wholesale service to hospitals, universities and the Lafayette Parish School System.

In 2003 during the campaign for city-parish president, candidate Joey Durel expressed in a Chamber of Commerce debate with his opponent that he would not be in favor of LUS competing in the private sector. However, once taking office, Joey Durel led the charge for a citywide fiber to the premise initiative. As he often said, "I begged the private sector to do it so that we wouldn't have to." With the incumbents refusing, local government was the only option.

In 2004, the city announced its proposal for a municipal fiber network providing broadband internet, cable TV, and telephone services to the city of Lafayette. 70 percent of residents and 80 percent of businesses responded positively to a market survey conducted by LUS. The questions asked and the raw results of the telephone poll were requested by interested parties in the public but were never released. The announcement of the project came within 4 months of Durel's inauguration, just one day after the closing of submission of new bills in the state legislature. This would presumably prevent a challenge in the state legislature by the incumbent phone and cable provider, as there are many laws on the books regulating phone and cable TV providers, but no laws regulating a local municipality entering such business sectors.

Representatives from the ILEC (Incumbent Local Exchange Provider) Bellsouth (now AT&T) lobbied representatives in the legislature to modify an existing bill to regulate municipal entities entering into the telecommunications business. This bill, negotiated between representatives from Bellsouth, Cox Communications, LUS, Louisiana Energy and Power Authority, Louisiana Municipal Association, Louisiana policy jury association, and Governor Kathleen Blanco became the Local Government Fair Competition Act of 2004. This bill was adapted from the Municipal Telecommunications Private Industry Safeguards Act, a model piece of legislation provided by the American Legislative Exchange Council (ALEC).

As per the requirements of Local Government Fair Competition Act (LGFCA), LUS conducted a Feasibility Study and presented the study in November 2004. The Lafayette city-parish council voted to adopt the study and proceed with the sale of bonds by resolution in December 2004 and opted to forgo a referendum. This resolution resulted in a petition for a referendum in January 2005 and a subsequent lawsuit in February. The petition was conducted by a non-profit group calling themselves Fiber411.com. The group was founded by 3 citizens of Lafayette who spoke out at the public hearings against the Feasibility Study and later joined by other volunteers and concerned citizens. While some accused the group of being shills for Bellsouth and Cox, the three were of backgrounds in oil and gas leasing, home building and oilfield engineering respectively, had never met prior to November 2004 and had no ties to the communications industry nor local government.

The petition was participated in by members of Fiber411.com and community volunteers and volunteers from Bellsouth and Cox. The administration highly contested the petition, which was ultimately not recognized as valid. Fiber411.com, being a volunteer group, decided not to sue to enforce the petition due to lack of funds. Bellsouth filed suit over the petition and won. The decision was based on the judge's determination that the city had used the incorrect set of Louisiana State laws to seek a sale of bonds that precluded a referendum mechanism. The district court decision further ruled that the petition used by Fiber411 was written to appeal to the correct set of state laws that the city should have been using. The city of Lafayette then had to decide if it would try again to sell bonds with or without a referendum. The city decided to have a referendum.

The council members of the city-parish government before 2005 had stated that they did not want a "media bloodbath" between the city and the incumbents, which was their reason for denying a referendum. In the end, the city of Lafayette hosted a series of "Town Hall" meetings where the Fiber project was discussed. Local Political Action Committees calling themselves LafayetteYes and LafayetteComingTogether, composed largely of political allies of the Administration, consultants, etc., raised and spent over $300,000 for media campaigns. Fiber411.com spent approximately $10,000, and Bellsouth spent less than $5,000. Cox spent $0.00 on the campaign. As such, the media campaign was very one-sided.

On July 16, 2005, the proposal was put to a vote, and the residents of Lafayette approved of the city's plan by a margin of 62% for and 38% against. In order to raise money for the project, the city had to borrow money through tax-exempt bonds. Again the state cable association and BellSouth sued Lafayette, alleging the bond ordinance didn't comply with state law. The suit was won by the city in district court but an appellate court panel ruled 3-0 that the city's ordinance to sell bonds violated the Local Government Fair Competition Act's requirement that the money to fund the fiber project must not be subsidized by funds from the existing utilities system.

Lafayette followed up the court loss with a new ordinance that amended the original. Two citizens of Lafayette sued (known as Elizabeth Naquin et al.) as well as Bellsouth. Bellsouth inexplicably declined to pay court costs for submission of the suit and ended up dropping the suit. Naquin et al. remained. LUS won in district court, but the appeals court again decided 3-0 that the city's ordinance violated the Local Government Fair Competition Act in a similar manner as the original ordinance. This time the city appealed to the Louisiana State Supreme court. The high court decided that the appeals court's ruling to enjoin (prevent) the city from selling bonds was based on a brief that was filed too late. When the high court threw out this brief, the argument that had succeeded in appeals court was no longer allowed. A unanimous ruling by the Louisiana State Supreme court reversed the appeals court's decision. This allowed the city to proceed with the sale of the bonds to fund the project.

In 2007, Lafayette was finally able to start issuing bonds. Construction started in 2008 on the network, and the first customers were receiving service in February 2009.

Previous logo

In 2025, LUS Fiber was rebranded to LFT Fiber.
