= Murad Kalam =

American writer

Murad Kalam (born Godffrey Williams; Arabic: مراد قلم) is an American writer.

Kalam was born to a Jamaican father and a white mother. His family moved around the country frequently before settling in the suburbs of Phoenix, Arizona, where he grew up. In 1999, Kalam graduated from Harvard College, where he studied writing under Jamaica Kincaid and published in the Harvard Advocate. He graduated from Harvard Law School in 2002.

While in his second year of law school, Kalam published his first short story, "Bow Down," in Harper's, which won an O. Henry Award. Shortly thereafter he published his first novel, Night Journey. In 2002, he was awarded a Fulbright Scholarship to write his second novel, A Reasonable Man, in Egypt.

He currently lives in Washington, DC with his wife, Rashann Duvall, whom he met in law school. He is a faculty member in the English department at the University of Maryland, College Park.

Kalam is a convert to orthodox Islam. His chosen name means "desire of the pen".
