= Kevin Werbach =

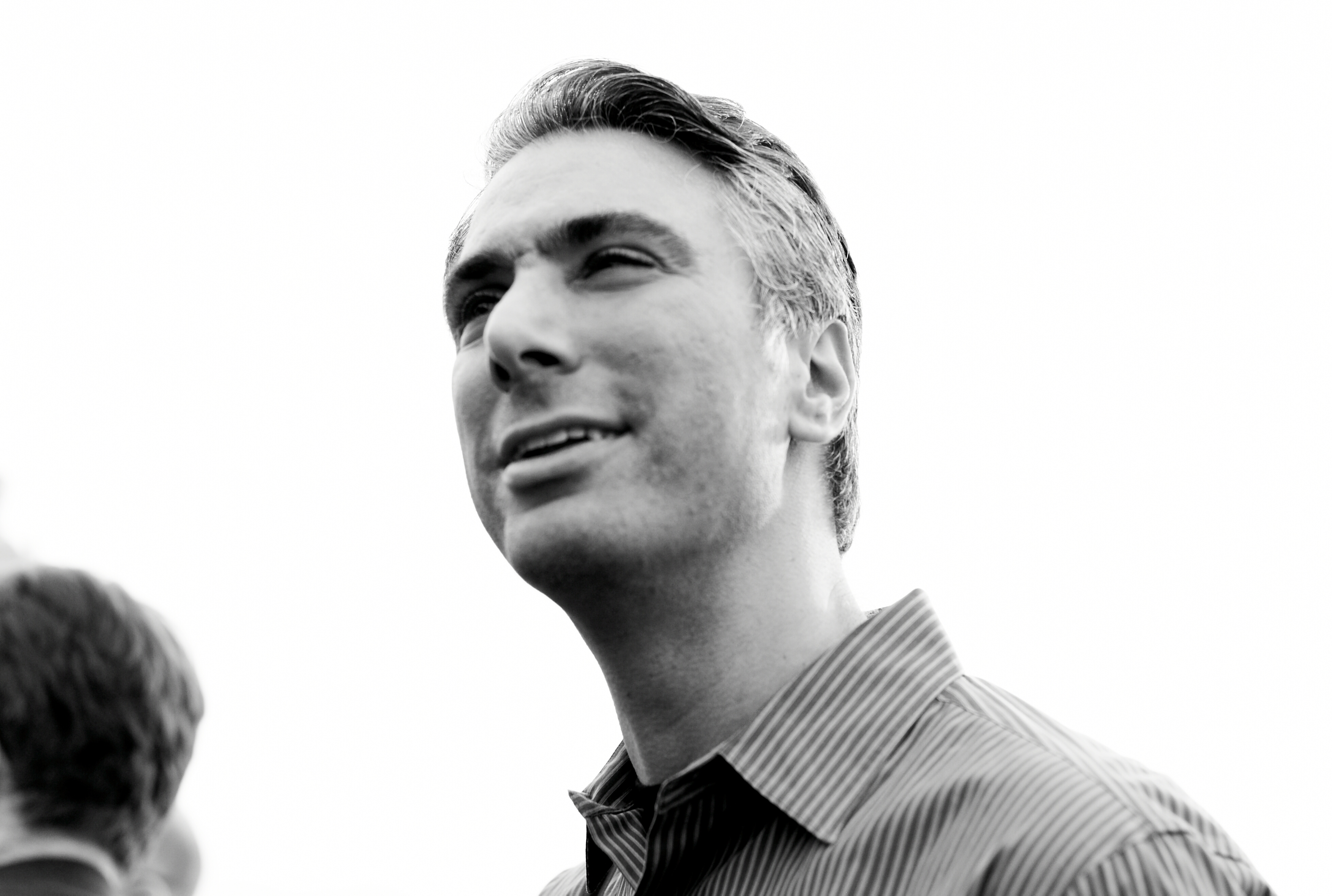
- Occupations: publisher, editor
- Known for: Internet and communications technologies

Kevin Werbach is an American academic, businessman and author. In 2002, he founded the Supernova Group, a technology analysis and consulting firm. Since 2004, Werbach is an Associate Professor of Legal Studies and Business Ethics at The Wharton School, University of Pennsylvania. He writes about business, policy, and social implications of emerging Internet and communications technologies.

On 14 November 2008 it was announced that then-President-elect Barack Obama has selected Susan Crawford and Werbach to lead the review of the Federal Communications Commission (FCC).

== Biography ==
Werbach holds a BA from the University of California at Berkeley (1991) and a JD from Harvard Law School (1994), where he was publishing editor of the Harvard Law Review and publisher of the Harvard Law Record.

Werbach was founder of the technology analysis and consulting firm Supernova Group (2002–present), editor of Release 1.0 (1998–2002), and counsel for new technology policy at the Federal Communications Commission (1994-1998) during the president Clinton administration. Werbach has also served on the board of directors of the TPRC Research Conference on Communication, Information and Internet Policy (2003–2009), is a Fellow at the Center for Global Communications (GLOCOM), International University of Japan (2002–present), and sat on the advisory board of Knowledge@Wharton (2005–present), Public Knowledge (2002–present) and Socialtext (2003–present).

Werbach is a professor of legal studies and business ethics at The Wharton School, University of Pennsylvania (since 2004). He was also the organizer of the annual Supernova technology conference and maintains a blog ("werblog").

On 14 November 2008 it was announced that President-elect Barack Obama has selected Susan Crawford and Werbach to lead the review of the Federal Communications Commission (FCC). The review team "will ensure that senior appointees have the information necessary to complete the confirmation process, lead their departments, and begin implementing signature policy initiatives immediately after they are sworn in."

Werbach's areas of interest are emerging internet technologies, telecommunications policy, electronic commerce, wireless communication, and regulation. He also maintains a website of flatulence related puns based on "Smelt It, Dealt It". He advises major information technology and communications companies on strategic business and policy implications of emerging technologies. At The Wharton School Werbach is currently working in the areas of evolving Internet architecture policy implications, regulation of Internet video, next-generation broadband access, and decentralized communications, computing, and media business implications. As a Network Neutrality advocate, Werbach supports the 2015 FCC's rule on network neutrality. Together with Phil Weiser, a professor and dean at the Colorado Law School, Werbach posted their public statements in the column on Huffington Post and Medium, getting much attention and mentions by well-known publications as Wired, The New York Times, Fortune and other significant publications.

In recent years, Werbach also engaged in the field of Gamification. He co-authored two books and created a Massive Open Online Course which aired on Coursera.

== Publications ==
- Digital Tornado: The Internet and Telecommunications Policy, (FCC Office of Plans and Policy Working Paper No. 29, March 1997).
- Syndication: The Emerging Model for Business in the Internet Era, Harvard Business Review 85 (May/June 2000).
- A Layered Model for Internet Policy, 1 J. TELECOMM. & HIGH TECH. L. 37 (2002).
- Radio Revolution: The Coming Age of Unlicensed Wireless, (New America Foundation and Public Knowledge, December 2003).
- Supercommons: Toward a Unified Theory of Wireless Communication, Texas L. Rev.863 82 (2004).
- Sensors and Sensibilities, 28 CARDOZO L. REV. 2321 (2007).
- Only Connect, 23 BERKELEY TECH. L. J. 1234 (2008).
- The Centripetal Network: How the Internet Holds Itself Together, and the Forces Tearing it Apart, 42 UC DAVIS L. REV. 343 (2009).
- Werbach, Kevin & Hunter, Dan (2012). For The Win: How Game Thinking Can Revolutionize Your Business, Wharton Digital Press, Boston. ISBN 1613630239.
- Werbach, Kevin & Hunter, Dan (2015). Gamification Toolkit: Dynamics, Mechanics, and Components for the Win, Wharton Digital Press, Boston.
