= Andrew Blum =

American author

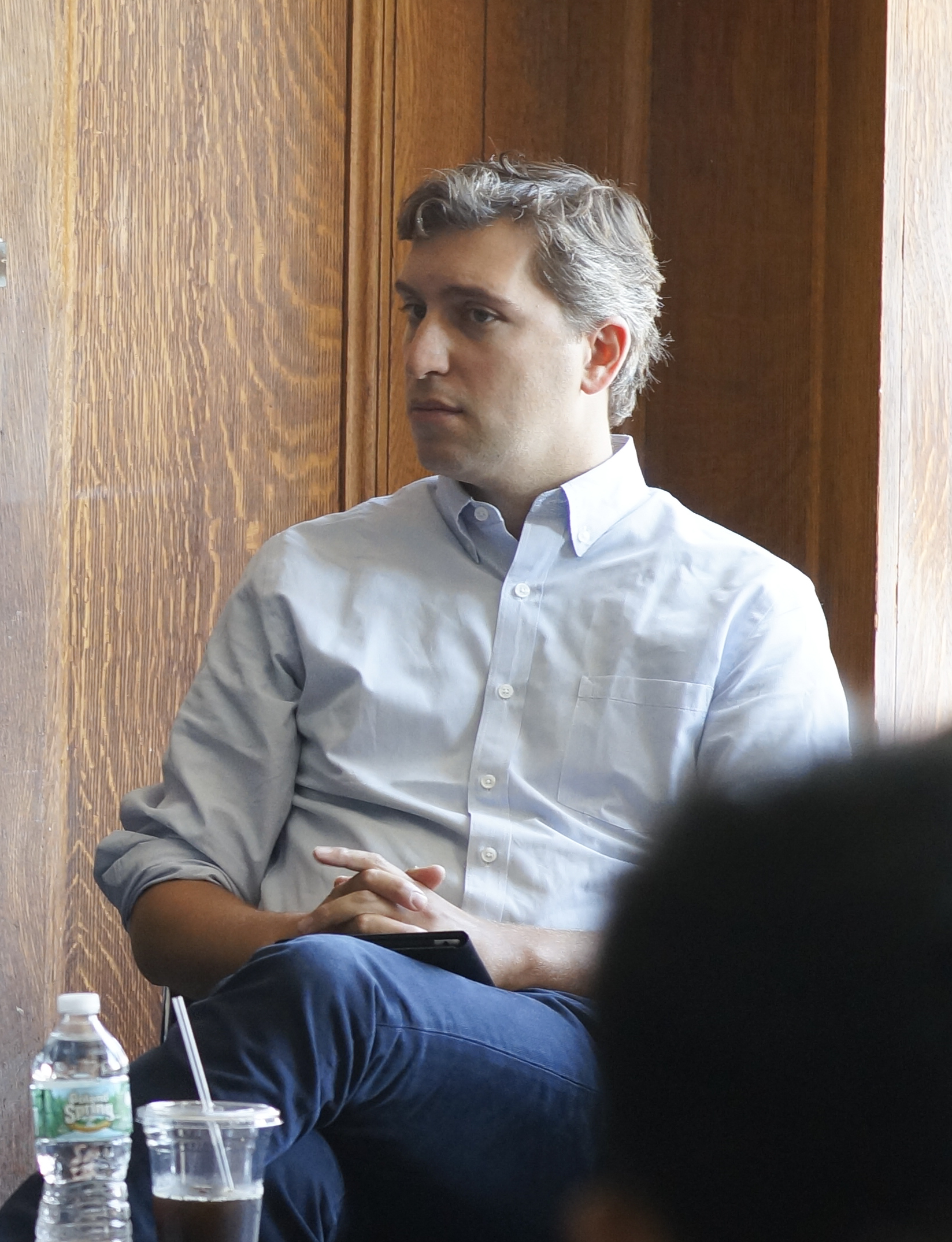
- Occupations: Writer, Journalist
- Notable work: Tubes: A Journey to the Center of the Internet

Andrew Blum is an American author and journalist. He writes about architecture, design, technology, urbanism, art, and travel. His writings have been published in various mainstream magazines such as Wired; Newsweek; the Wall Street Journal; the New Yorker; the New York Times; Vanity Fair; BusinessWeek; Slate; and Popular Science.

== Early life ==
He was born in New York City. He received a degree in literature from Amherst College and another in human geography from the University of Toronto.

== Works ==
- Tubes: A Journey to the Center of the Internet (2012)
- The Weather Machine: A Journey Inside the Forecast (2019)
