= David Bollier =

American activist

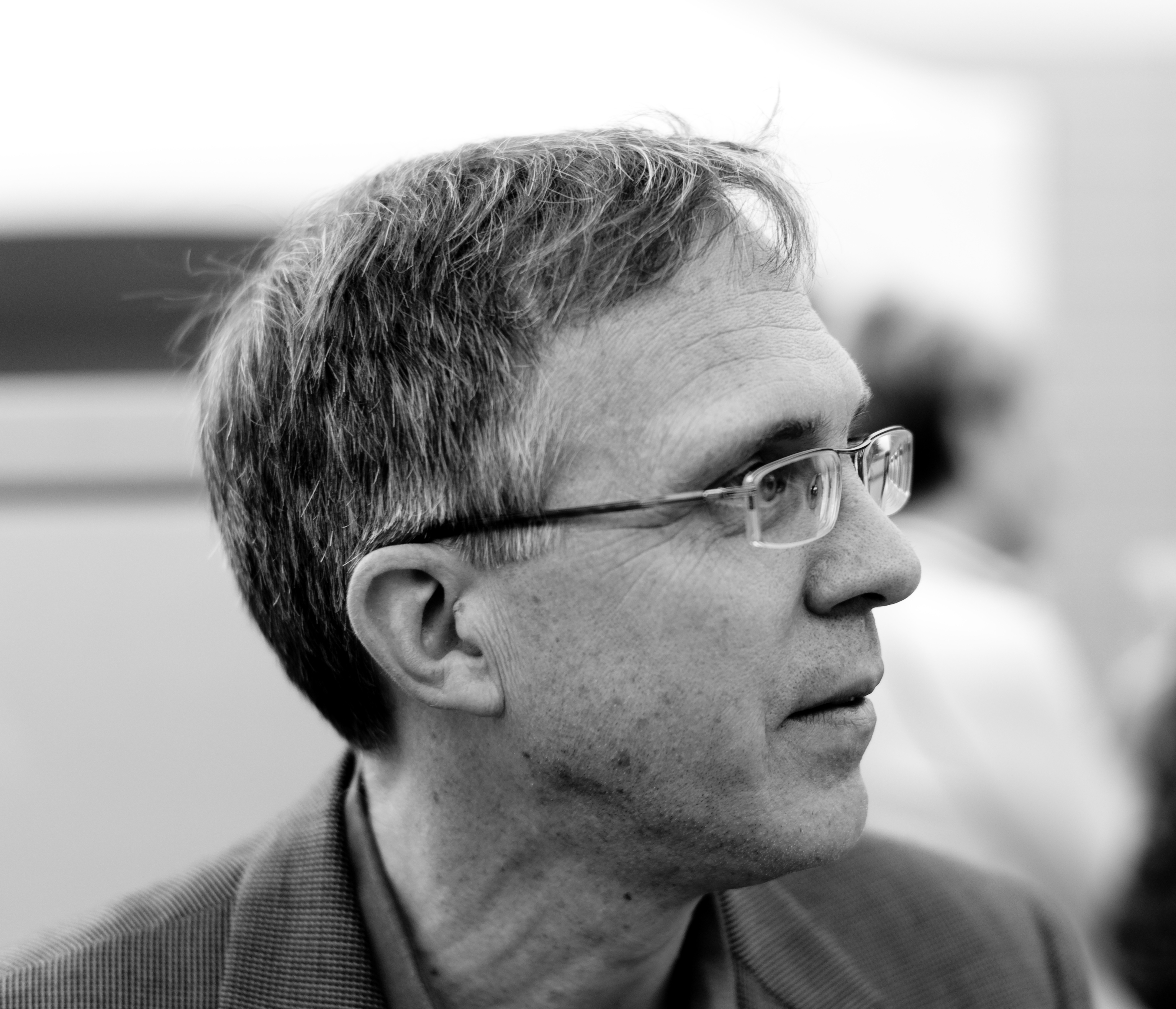
- Bollier in 2007
- Born: U.S.
- Occupations: Activist; writer; policy strategist
- Writing career
- Notable awards: Berlin Prize
- Website: www.bollier.org

David Bollier is an American activist, writer, and blogger who is focused on the commons as a paradigm for re-imagining economics, politics, and culture. He is a director of the Reinventing the Commons Program at the Schumacher Center for a New Economics, and is co-founder of the Commons Strategies Group, an international advocacy project.

== Career ==
Bollier was founding editor of On the Commons (2003–2010), and now blogs at his own website. Bollier calls his work “exploring the commons as a new paradigm of economics, politics and culture.”

Bollier co-founded Public Knowledge in 2001 and served as a board member until 2010. He was awarded the 2012 Bosch Berlin Prize in Public Policy at the American Academy in Berlin. He collaborated with television writer/producer Norman Lear from 1985 to 2010 on political and public affairs projects, and worked with Ralph Nader in the late 1970s and early 1980s.

== Personal life ==
He lives in Amherst, Massachusetts.

== Books ==
- The Commoner's Catalog for Changemaking: Tools for the Transitions Ahead (Schumacher Center for a New Economics, 2021)
- The Great Awakening: New Modes of Life Amidst Capitalist Ruins, (with co-editor Anna Grear) (Punctum Books, 2020)
- Free, Fair and Alive: The Insurgent Power of the Commons (with co-author Silke Helfrich) (New Society Publishers, 2019, ISBN 978-0865719217)
- Patterns of Commoning (with co-author Silke Helfrich) (Off the Common Books, 2015)
- From Bitcoin to Burning Man and Beyond: The Quest for Identity and Autonomy in a Digital Society (with co-editor John H. Clippinger) (ID3 and Off the Common Books, 2014)
- Think Like a Commoner: A Short Introduction to the Life of the Commons" (New Society Publishers), 2014)
- Green Governance: Ecological Survival, Human Rights and the Law of the Commons" (with co-author Burns H. Weston) (Cambridge University Press), 2012)
- The Wealth of the Commons: A World Beyond Market and State" (with co-editor Silke Helfrich) (Levellers Press, 2012)
- Viral Spiral: How the Commoners Built a Digital Republic of Their Own (New Press, 2009)
- Ready to Share: Fashion and the Ownership of Creativity (Lear Center Press, 2006)
- Brand Name Bullies: The Quest to Own and Control Culture (John Wiley & Sons, 2005)
- Sophisticated Sabotage: The Intellectual Games Used to Subvert Responsible Regulation (with Thomas McGarity and Sidney Shapiro; Environmental Law Institute, 2004)
- Artists, Technology and the Ownership of Creative Content (Norman Lear Center, 2003)
- Silent Theft: The Private Plunder of Our Common Wealth (Routledge, 2002)
- Aiming Higher: 25 Stories of How Companies Prosper by Combining Sound Management and Social Vision. (AMACOM, 1996)
- The Great Hartford Circus Fire: Creative Settlement of Mass Disasters (Yale University Press, 1991)
- Crusaders & Criminals, Victims & Visionaries: Historic Encounters Between Connecticut Citizens and the United States Supreme Court (Connecticut Attorney General, 1986)
