= Susan P. Crawford =

Professor of Law at Harvard Law School

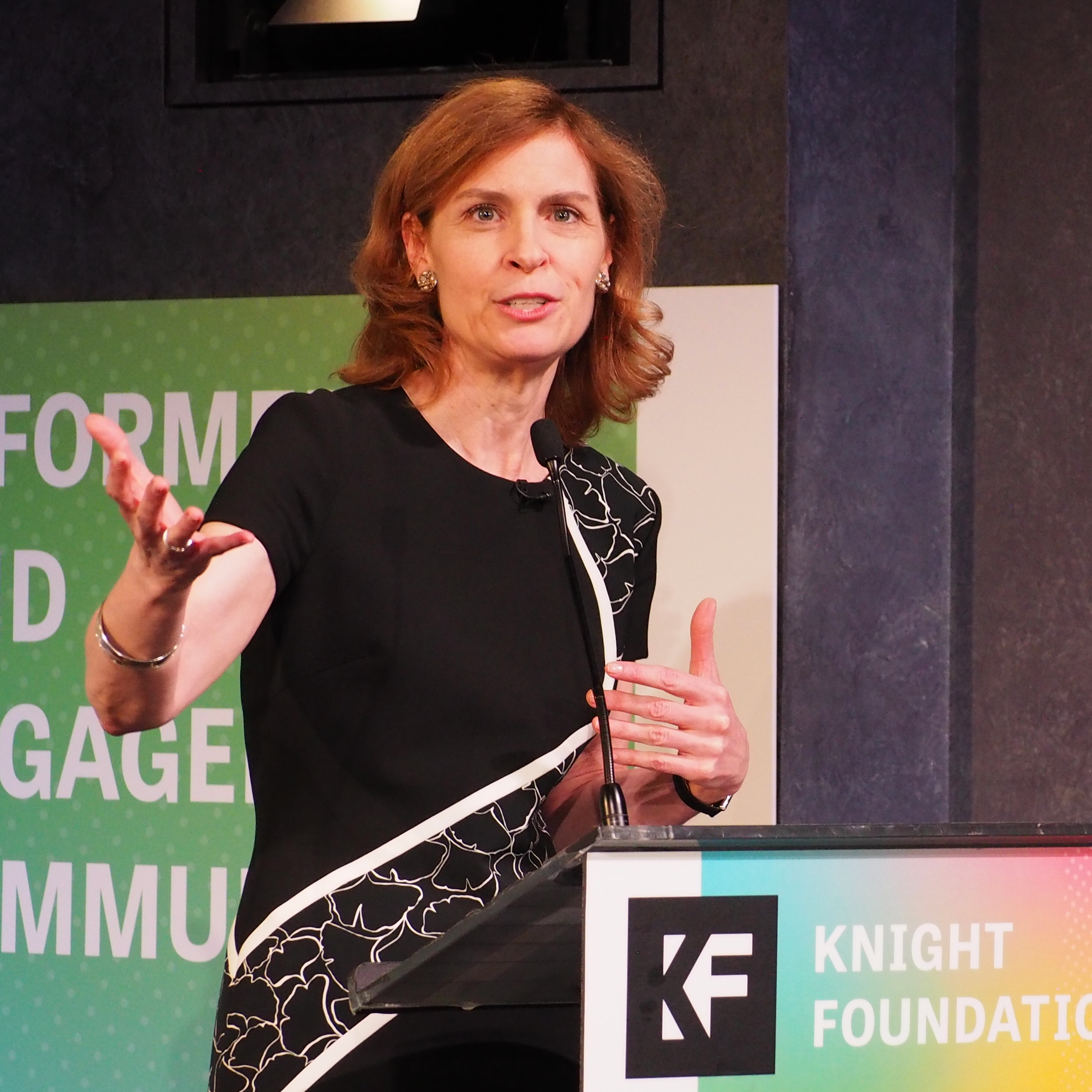
- Crawford keynotes a Knight News Challenge event in New York City, November 2017.
- Born: February 27, 1963 (age 63); Santa Monica, California, U.S.
- Education: Yale University (BA, JD)
- Occupation: Law professor
- Employer: Obama Administration (Formerly)
- Organization: ICANN (Board member) OneWebDay (Founder)
- Known for: Policy research, author, telecommunications and information law

Susan P. Crawford (born February 27, 1963) is an American professor. She is the John A. Reilly Clinical Professor of Law at Harvard Law School. She served as President Barack Obama's Special Assistant for Science, Technology, and Innovation Policy (2009) and is a columnist for WIRED. She is a former board member of ICANN, the founder of OneWebDay, and a legal scholar. Her research focuses on telecommunications and information law.

== Early life and education ==
Crawford was born in 1963 and grew up in Santa Monica, where she attended Santa Monica High School, and played violin in the "Samohi" orchestra.

Crawford received her B.A. (summa cum laude, Phi Beta Kappa) and J.D. from Yale University. While at Yale, Crawford was the principal violist in the Yale Symphony Orchestra and continues her daily practice and occasionally performs publicly.

== Career ==
After earning her J.D. degree, Crawford served as a law clerk for Judge Raymond J. Dearie of the U.S. District Court for the Eastern District of New York, and was a partner at Wilmer, Cutler & Pickering (Washington, D.C.) until the end of 2002, when she left that firm to become a professor.

After first teaching at Cardozo School of Law in New York City, Crawford became a visiting professor at the University of Michigan Law School in the fall of 2007. After visiting at Yale Law School in the spring of 2008, she was admitted to the faculty at the University of Michigan Law School. On July 1, 2010, Crawford rejoined the faculty at Cardozo, and also commenced as a Visiting Research Collaborator at the Center for Information Technology Policy at Princeton.

In 2012, Crawford visited Harvard's John F. Kennedy School of Government as the Stanton Professor of the First Amendment and also was a visiting professor at Harvard Law School. Since 2015 she has been on the faculty of Harvard Law School.

In 2015, Politico named Crawford (along with scholars Marvin Ammori and Tim Wu) as one of its top 50 thinkers of the year, citing her contributions to the net neutrality movement.

=== Internet activism ===
Crawford served as a member of the board of directors for ICANN from 2005 to 2008. In 2005 she founded OneWebDay - a global celebration of the Internet. She is known as a champion of net neutrality, and has written on many other current policy issues. In 2012, Yale University Press published her book, Captive Audience: The Telecom Industry and Monopoly Power in the New Gilded Age. In April 2014, Crawford proposed that a possible solution to net neutrality concerns may be municipal broadband.

Crawford was critical of the FCC's 2017 decision to end net neutrality, stating that the ruling was "handing the power to choose winners and losers online to about five companies."

=== Public service ===
Crawford and Kevin Werbach served on the Federal Communications Commission Review team in the Obama transition. In early 2009, Crawford was appointed the President's Special Assistant for Science, Technology, and Innovation Policy. In October 2009, it was announced that she would step down when her one-year sabbatical from the University of Michigan ended in January 2010.

In October 2011, Crawford was appointed to Mayor Bloomberg's Council on Technology and Innovation.

== Awards ==
- Fast Company – Top 100 Global Thinkers (2013)
- Prospect Magazine – Top Ten Brains of the Digital Future (2011)
- Time – Tech 40: Most Influential Minds in Tech (2013)
- Politico –Top 50 Thinkers of the Year (2015)

== Books ==
- Crawford, Susan (2013). Captive Audience: The Telecom Industry and Monopoly in the New Gilded Age. Yale U. Pr. ISBN 978-0-300-15313-2.
- Crawford, Susan (2014). The Responsive City: Engaging Communities Through Data-Smart Governance. Jossey-Bass. ISBN 978-1118910900.
- Crawford, Susan (2018). Fiber: The Coming Tech Revolution―and Why America Might Miss It. Yale U. Pr. ISBN 978-0300228502.
- Crawford, Susan (2023). Charleston: Race, Water, and the Coming Storm. Simon and Schuster. ISBN 978-1639363582.
