= Jørgen Østergaard =

Danish engineer (born 1944)

- Born: 29 July 1944 (age 82); Sindal, Denmark
- Education: Danish Academy of Engineering
- Scientific career
- Fields: Engineering
- Workplaces: Aalborg University

Jørgen Østergaard (born 29 July 1944 in Sindal) is a Danish Engineer and former rector at Aalborg University.

Jørgen Østergaard is born in Sindal North Jutland in Denmark in 1944 and later graduated high school in Hjørring. He studied engineering at the Danish Academy of Engineering. After finishing his education he first worked at the Teletechnical Research Laboratory and then at the Danish Academy of Engineerings department in Aalborg which later merged with Aalborg University. From 1980 to 1989 he worked as the Dean of the Faculty of Engineering and Science at Aalborg University. After some years as an associate professor he was elected prorector at Aalborg University which was a position that he occupied from 1993 to 2004. In 2004 Jørgen Østergaard took over the title as rector at Aalborg University from his predecessor Sven Caspersen who left the job to become the chairman of the university. However Jørgen Østergaard only chose to be rector at Aalborg University for about a year before he himself resigned in favor of his successor Finn Kjærsdam. Jørgen Østergaard however continued at the university after his short reign as rector in his former position as prorector at Aalborg University. Later he became chief advisor with the important responsibility for the university's physical expansion.
