= Aalborg University Copenhagen =

University campus in Denmark

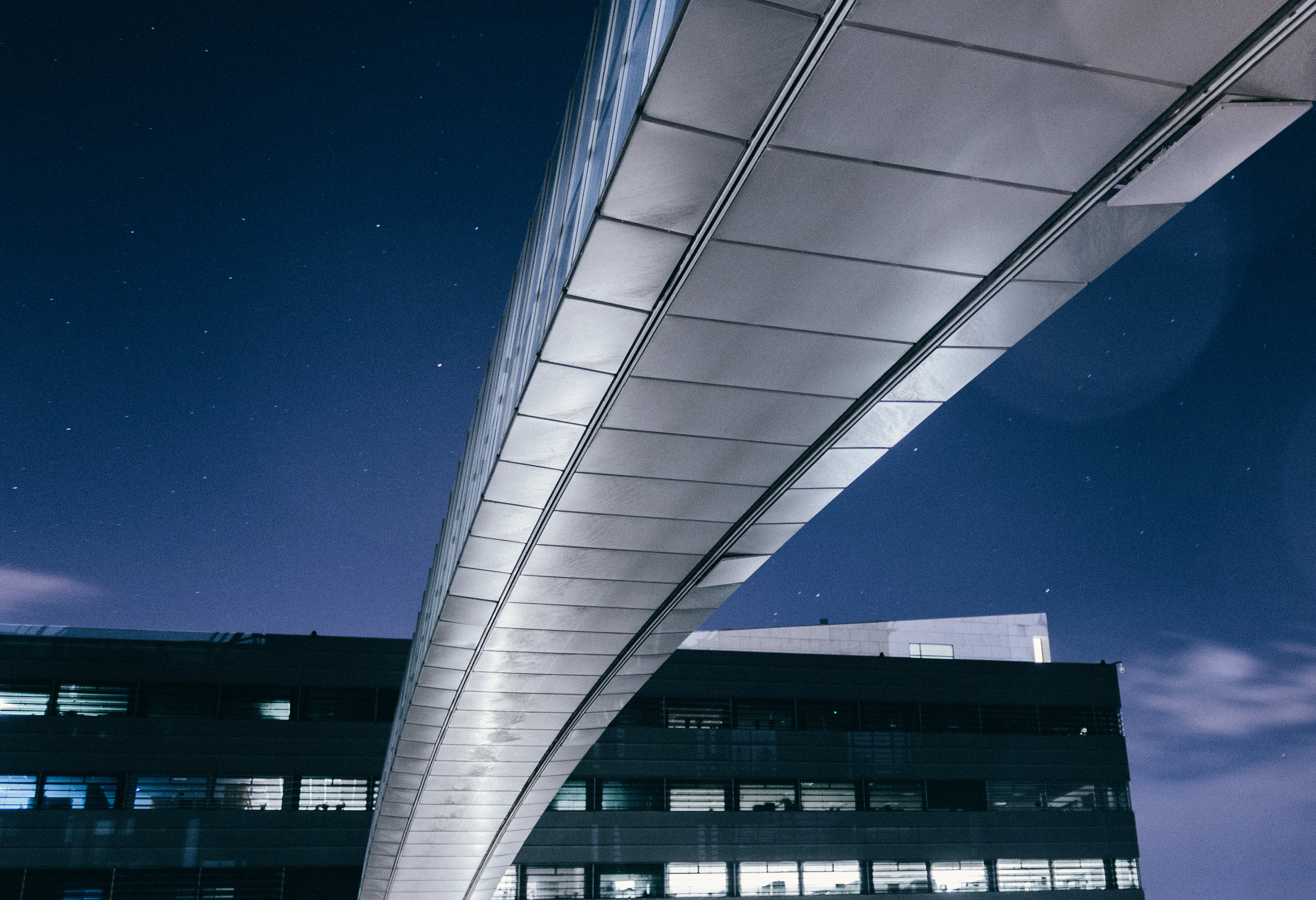
- Other name: AAU CPH
- Motto: Viis Novis
- Type: Public university
- Established: 2005
- Affiliations: BSU, ECIU, Ilisimatusarfik, NC, NUAS, OECD, SDC,
- Rector: Per Michael Johansen
- Administrative staff: 288 (150 researchers)
- Students: 3,300
- Doctoral students: 50
- Location: Copenhagen, Denmark
- Colours: Blue and white
- Website: www.aau-cph.dk

Aalborg University Copenhagen, also referred to as AAU CPH, is a university campus operated by Aalborg University in Copenhagen, Denmark. It is home to all of Aalborg University's educational and research activities in the Greater Copenhagen area. The buildings, located at Teglholmen, are a former Nokia research & development center.

AAU CPH offers 10 undergraduate programmes (bachelor degrees) and 24 Master programmes graduate programmes (master degrees), both within the fields of natural sciences and humanities. The programmes are mostly taught in English. Aalborg University Copenhagen has approximately 4,000 students and 600 employees. The campus is also home to a number for innovative startup businesses at Sydhavnen close to central Copenhagen.

== Research ==
Research activities at AAU CPH are an integrated part of Aalborg University's activities at the three campuses in Aalborg, Copenhagen, and Esbjerg and are carried out in collaboration with a wide variety of research institutions as well as public and private corporations. Researchers and PhD fellows from Aalborg Universities departments are represented at AAU CPH and contributes with research and knowledge production within as varied areas as virtual reality, sound and music computing, mobile communication, sustainable energy sources, organisational communications and processes of democracy in Latin America.

== Study and work method ==
A trademark of Aalborg University is its unique pedagogic model of teaching: the problem-based, project-organized model. With this method a great part of the semester teaching and student work revolves around complex real-life problems that the students wonder about and try to find answers to in scientific manners while working together in groups. The more traditional forms of teaching are of course also used, e.g. lectures, courses, seminars, classroom training, laboratory work and workshops.

=== Research-based education ===
At AAU CPH the study programs are research based. Teaching materials at AAU CPH come not only from books but also from, for example, articles in current journals.

== Danish Building Research Institute ==
On 1 January 2007 Aalborg University and the Danish Building Research Institute merged. The merger initiated a comprehensive centre for knowledge about the built environment. The goal of the centre is to become the leading place of its kind in Denmark and to be considered on par with similar centres internationally.
