= Graugaard =

Graugaard is a surname. Notable people with the surname include:

- Christian Graugaard (born 1967), Danish medical doctor
- Lars Graugaard (born 1957), Danish composer
