= Søren Dosenrode =

Danish political scientist

Søren Dosenrode-Lynge is a Danish political scientist. Since 1994 Dosenrode has been Jean Monnet Professor of European Politics and Administration at Aalborg University, and was professor of international politics in 2012–2019. Since 2023 he is professor of contemporary history also at Aalborg University.

== Biography ==
Dosenrode holds a cand. phil. (M.Phil., 1987) in political science from the University of Copenhagen and a dr. phil. in political science from the University of Zürich (1992).

From 1995 to 2000 Dosenrode was a head of studies (studieleder) in which capacity he initiated i.a. the international Master of European Studies in 1997. In the period 1996-2002 Dosenrode was chairman of the board of Aalborg University Press.

In 2001 he founded the Institute of History, international and Social Studies at Aalborg University and was it first director (Jan. 2000 until Dec. 2005) He also founded the Center of Comparative Integration Studies (2005-2016), the Kaj Munk Research Center (2005->) and received a Jean Monnet Center of Excellence (2015). Since 2017 he heads the Aalborg Center of European Studies (ACEuS), and from 2020 the Regional and International studies research group (REGIS).

Dosenrode was a senior guest research at various universities in Europe. During the summer 2003 he attended the MLE at Harvard University

Dosenrode is or has been a chairman or a member of various boards and committees including the Danish government's Council for European Politics. Since 2008, Dosenrode is a member of the board of the Danish Society for European Studies (Danish branch of ECSA), from 2020 as vice president.

Dosenrode has been decorated on a number of occasions e.g. Member of the Danish Order of Dannebrog (2014), Officer of the Austria Decoration of Honor for Services to the Republic of Austria (2021), and Knight of Honor of the German Order of Saint John (2014).

== Research ==
His scholarly work focuses on theory of regional integration, Europeanization, European Studies, as well as Christianity and politics focusing on studies of Kaj Munk and his time.

== Books ==
- The European Union and the Middle East. London: Sheffield Academic Press, (2002), ISBN 978-0826460882.
- Approaching the EUropean federation?. Aldershot, England, (2007), Ashgate Pub. ISBN 978-0-7546-4244-2.
- The European Union after Lisbon: Polity, Politics, Policy. Ashgate Publishing, (28 April 2013), Ltd. ISBN 978-1-4094-7690-0.
- Limits to Regional Integration. Farnham, Surrey, England, (28 March 2015), Ashgate Publishing, Ltd. ISBN 978-1-4724-5334-1.
- The Nordic Regions and the European Union (1st ed.). (18 January 2018), Routledge.
- "Political Aspects of the Economic Monetary Union". (6 February 2018), Routledge.
