= Lars Gunnarsen =

Danish professor

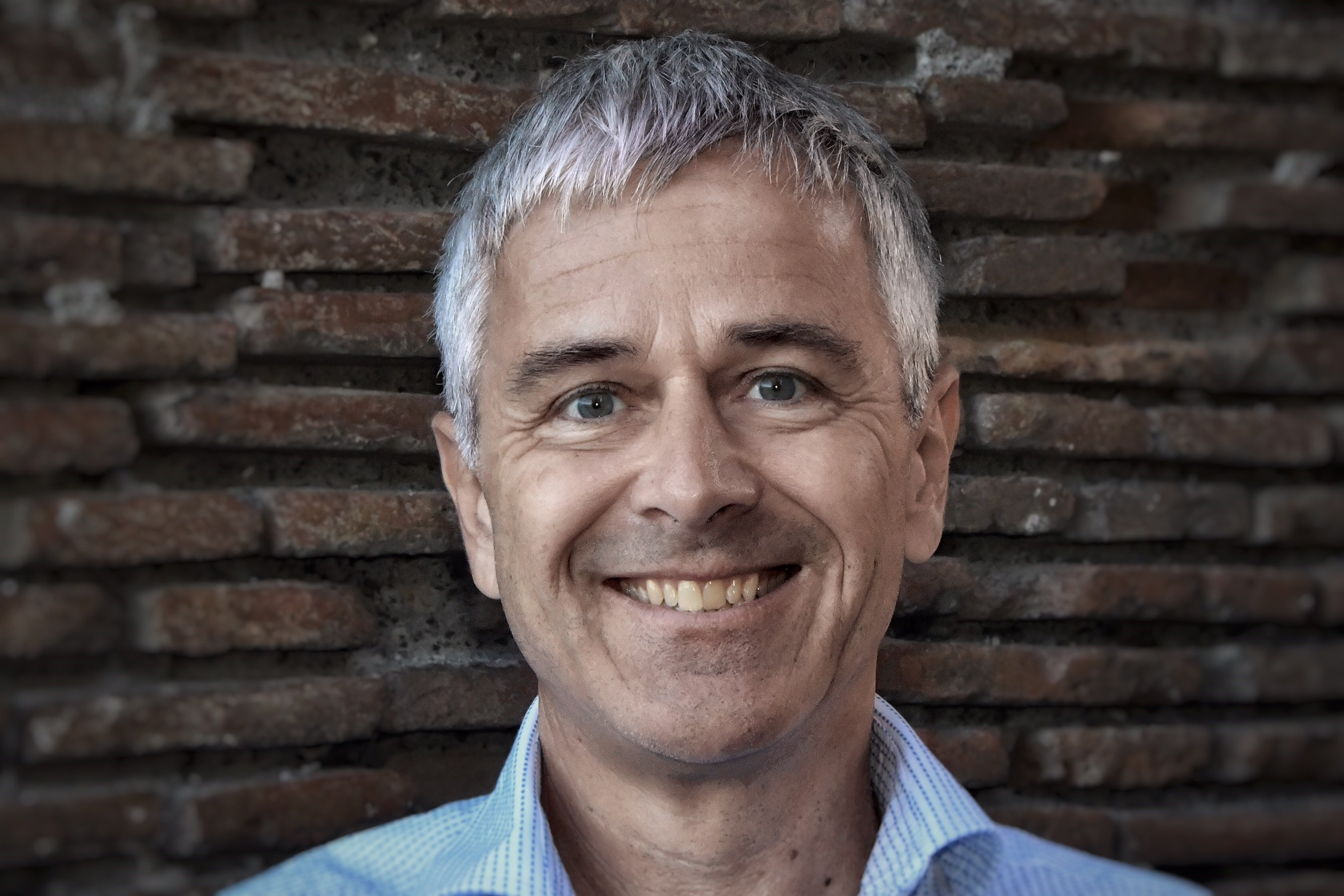
Lars Gunnarsen

Lars Gunnarsen is a Danish professor in construction at Aalborg University where he conducts research in indoor climate and ventilation.

Lars Gunnarsen's research on how to achieve and maintain a safe and healthy environment at home has been frequently cited and used. His research has also shown that the use of natural materials in construction might indirectly increase the risk of chemicals being used. Lars Gunnarsen has also pointed out the need for attention on healthy indoor climates as a future driver for innovation and new markets in the building branch.

== Education ==
Lars Gunnarsen graduated as Master in Mechanical Engineering, from the Danish Technical University in 1984. In 1989, he was awarded a PhD degree.
