= AAU Faculty of Humanities =

Faculty at Aalborg University in Denmark

The Faculty of Humanities at Aalborg University is one of five faculties at AAU. The Faculty of Humanities consists of three departments and has approximately 4295 students and approximately 570 employees (2019). The Faculty was headed by Dean Lone Dirckinck-Holmfeld in collaboration with Associate Dean Jørgen Stigel until January 2015, when Dirckinck-Holmfeld stepped down, and Stigel became Constituted Dean, and Henrik Halkier took over as Associate Dean.

== Departments under The Faculty of Humanities ==
- Department of Communication and Philosophy
- Department of Culture and Global Studies

== The programs under The Faculty of Humanities ==
Bachelor programs conducted in Danish

- Applied Philosophy
- Communication and Digital Media (Communication, Human Centered Informatics, Interactive Digital Media) (offered in AAL/CPH)
- Danish
- English
- Experience Technology
- International Business Communication (English, French, Spanish, German)
- Language and International Studies, English (LISE)
- Music
- Music Therapy
- Organizational Learning
- Psychology
- Spanish and International Studies
- German

Master programs conducted in Danish

- Applied Philosophy
- Communication
- Danish
- English
- Experience Design
- German
- Interactive Digital Media (IndiMedia)
- IT, Learning and Processes of Change (offered in AAU/CPH)
- Language and International Business Communication (English, French, Spanish, German, IT/Communication)
- Learning and Organisational Adaptation
- Music
- Music Therapy
- Persuasive Design
- Psychology

Master programs conducted in English

- Information Architecture (offered in AAL/CPH)
- Information Studies
- Culture, Communication and Globalisation
- Tourism (offered in AAL/CPH)
