= Ann-Dorte Christensen =

Danish sociologist and gender studies researcher (born 1954)

- Born: 23 October 1954 (age 72); Viborg, Denmark

Academic background
- Education: MA in 1982 and PhD in 1990 from Aalborg University

Academic work
- Discipline: Sociology, gender studies

Ann-Dorte Christensen is a Danish professor at the Department of Sociology and Social Work at Aalborg University.

== Education ==
In 1982 Christensen graduated as Master of Philosophy in social science at Aalborg University. Subsequently, Christensen worked as a postgraduate fellow on the project "The new social movements of the 60s and 70s" at the Department of Education and Socialization at Aalborg University.

In 1990, Christensen received her PhD in social science from Aalborg University.

== Career ==
Christensen was the national coordinator for gender studies from 1988 to 1992. In 1992, she was hired as assistant professor of political sociology at Aalborg University. Since 1996 she continued as an associate professor.

Since 2008, Christensen has been employed as professor of the sociology of gender at the Department of Sociology and Social work at Aalborg University. Christensen's research mainly touches on areas such as gender, masculinity, ethnicity, radicalization and everyday life. For a number of years, she has worked with analysis of life stories as an input to understanding social development.

Christensen has been in charge of a number of research projects. These include the MARS project on masculinity, accidents at work and safety, intersectionality and local community, as well as the INTERLOC project on gender, social class and identity.

Christensen has been a senior researcher on a comprehensive Danish study on power in the project "Change in Gender power. Power and democratization processes in Denmark". The project was made together with Anette Borchorst and Birte Siim and was conducted in association with the research program GEP, Gender, Empowerment and Politics.

Christensen is a member of the Award Committee at the Spar Nord Fund, co-editor of Norma: International Journal for Masculinity Studies, a board member at Viborg Katedralskole and at Aalborg University, and a member of the Program Board for Gender Research at the Division of Science in the Research Council of Norway and of the Equality Council:
