= Carlo Pietrobelli =

Italian economist (born 1959)

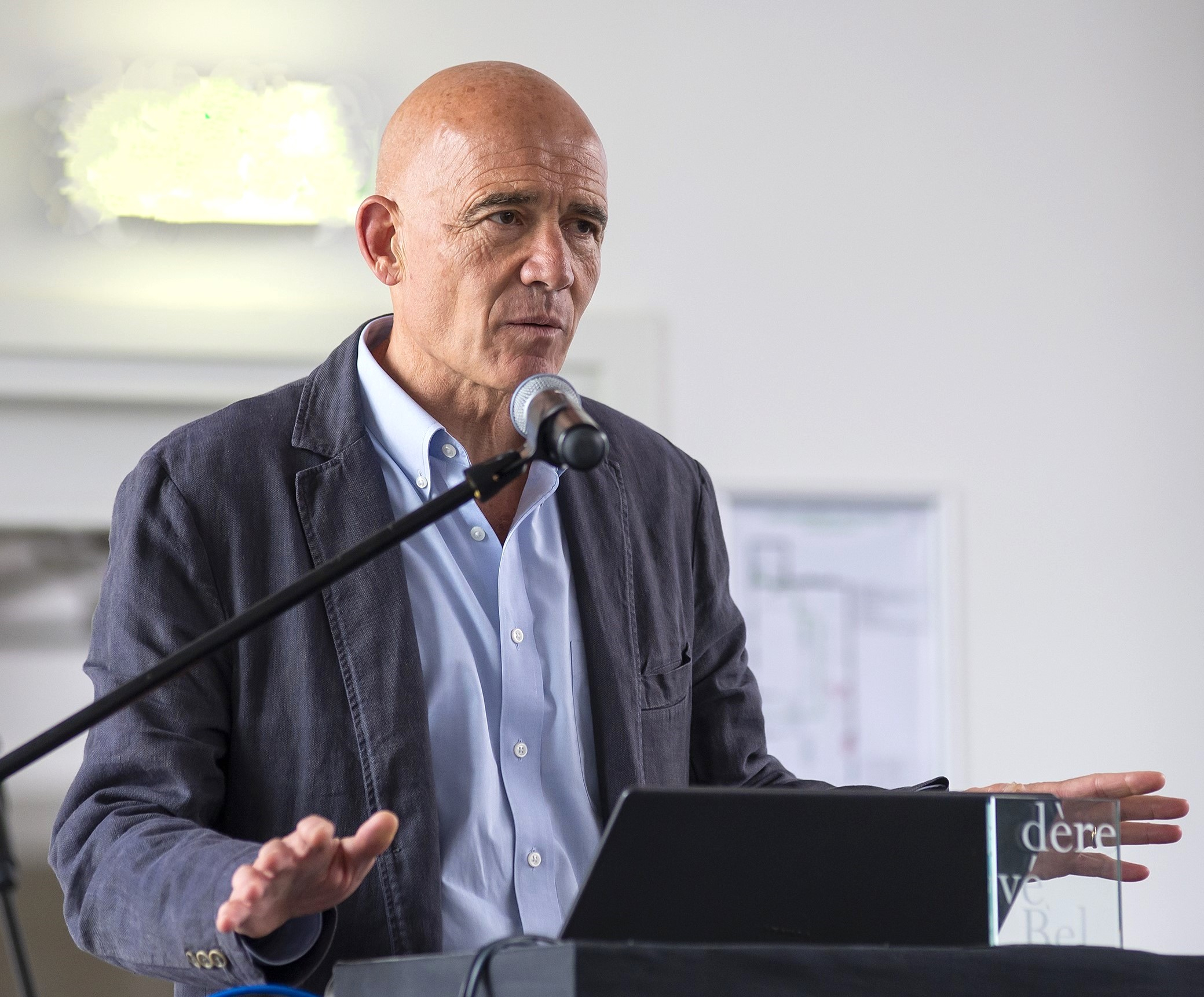
- Born: 9 October 1959 (age 66); Italy
- Citizenship: Italian
- Occupations: Economist, academic
- Employer(s): Roma Tre University; UNU-MERIT
- Known for: Research on global value chains, industrial development, and innovation policy

Carlo Pietrobelli (born 9 October 1959) is an Italian economist and academic whose research focuses on industrial development, innovation policy, and global value chains (GVCs), particularly in developing countries. He is a Professor of Economics at Roma Tre University in Rome and holds a UNESCO Chair on "Science, Technology and Innovation Policies for Sustainable Development in Latin America" at the United Nations University (UNU-MERIT) in Maastricht.

He has an h-index of 48 with over 14,000 total citations according to Google Scholar.

== Education ==
Pietrobelli earned a Laurea in Economics and Commerce from LUISS University in Rome in 1983. He subsequently obtained an M.Sc. in Development Economics from the University of Oxford in 1987, followed by a Ph.D. in Economics from the University of Rome La Sapienza in 1991 and a Ph.D. in Economics from the University of Oxford in 1993.

== Academic career ==
Pietrobelli began his academic career as a tenured lecturer (Ricercatore) in Economics at the University of Rome Tor Vergata from 1991 to 1998. He subsequently served as Associate Professor of Economics at the University of Molise from 1998 to 2001.

In 2001, he joined Roma Tre University as a full Professor of Economics. At Roma Tre he served as Deputy Rector for University–Industry linkages and chief advisor to the university's Industrial Liaison Office from 2005 to 2009. He was Dean of the Department of Economics from 2019 to 2022.

Since 2016, Pietrobelli has been a Professorial Fellow at UNU-MERIT in Maastricht. In June 2022, he was appointed UNESCO Chair on "Science, Technology and Innovation Policies for Sustainable Development for Latin America" at UNU-MERIT.

From 2009 to 2016, Pietrobelli served as Lead Economist in the Competitiveness, Technology and Innovation Division of the Inter-American Development Bank (IDB) in Washington, D.C., on leave from academia.

During 2015 and 2016, he was an Adjunct Professor at Georgetown University's School of Foreign Service. He has held visiting professorships at the University of Oxford, Johns Hopkins SAIS, and the University of Maryland.

Pietrobelli has served as a policy advisor to the European Commission, the World Bank, the International Fund for Agricultural Development, the United Nations Industrial Development Organization, the United Nations Conference on Trade and Development, the Economic Commission for Latin America and the Caribbean (ECLAC), and the OECD.

== Research ==
Pietrobelli's research covers development economics, innovation studies, and the role of global value chains in industrial upgrading. His frequent co-authors include Roberta Rabellotti, Elisa Giuliani, Silvia Nenci, and Riccardo Crescenzi.

In work with Roberta Rabellotti, Pietrobelli examined how enterprise clusters in emerging economies can enable product and process upgrading, arguing that outcomes depend on governance, power relations, and links with global value chains. Their findings were published by Harvard University Press and in a 2005 article in World Development.

A 2011 paper with Rabellotti in World Development examined the interaction between global value chains and national innovation systems, arguing that integration into GVCs offers developing countries opportunities to access knowledge and enhance learning and innovation, and that the form of GVC governance shapes learning outcomes.

Pietrobelli has written on what he terms "GVC-oriented policies." A 2021 paper co-authored with Rabellotti and Ari Van Assche in the Journal of International Business Policy proposed a taxonomy of such policies based on objectives including promoting GVC participation, capturing local value, ensuring inclusiveness, and building supply chain resilience.

Pietrobelli's research has also examined how resource-rich developing countries can leverage endowments of critical minerals for structural transformation. Related work introduced a methodology using economic complexity techniques to estimate countries' mining competitiveness and the criticality of specific minerals, published in Resources Policy in 2025.

A 2022 paper in World Development co-authored with Delera, Calza, and Lavopa examined the adoption of Industry 4.0 technologies in developing countries, finding that firms participating in GVCs were more likely to adopt advanced digital production technologies.

== Books ==
- Pietrobelli, C., & Rabellotti, R. (2007). Upgrading to Compete: Global Value Chains, SMEs and Clusters in Latin America. Cambridge, MA: Harvard University Press.
- Grazzi, M., & Pietrobelli, C. (Eds.). (2016). Firm Innovation and Productivity in Latin America and the Caribbean: The Engine of Economic Development. New York: Palgrave Macmillan.
- Lall, S., & Pietrobelli, C. (2002). Failing to Compete: Technology Development and Technology Systems in Africa. Cheltenham: Edward Elgar Publishing.
- Maffioli, A., Pietrobelli, C., & Stucchi, R. (Eds.). (2016). The Impact Evaluation of Cluster Development Programs. Washington, D.C.: Inter-American Development Bank.
- Guerrieri, P., Iammarino, S., & Pietrobelli, C. (2001). The Global Challenge to Industrial Districts: SMEs in Italy and Taiwan. Cheltenham: Edward Elgar.
- Pietrobelli, C. (1998). Industry, Competitiveness and Technological Capabilities in Chile: A New Tiger from Latin America? London: Macmillan.
