= Henrik Schärfe =

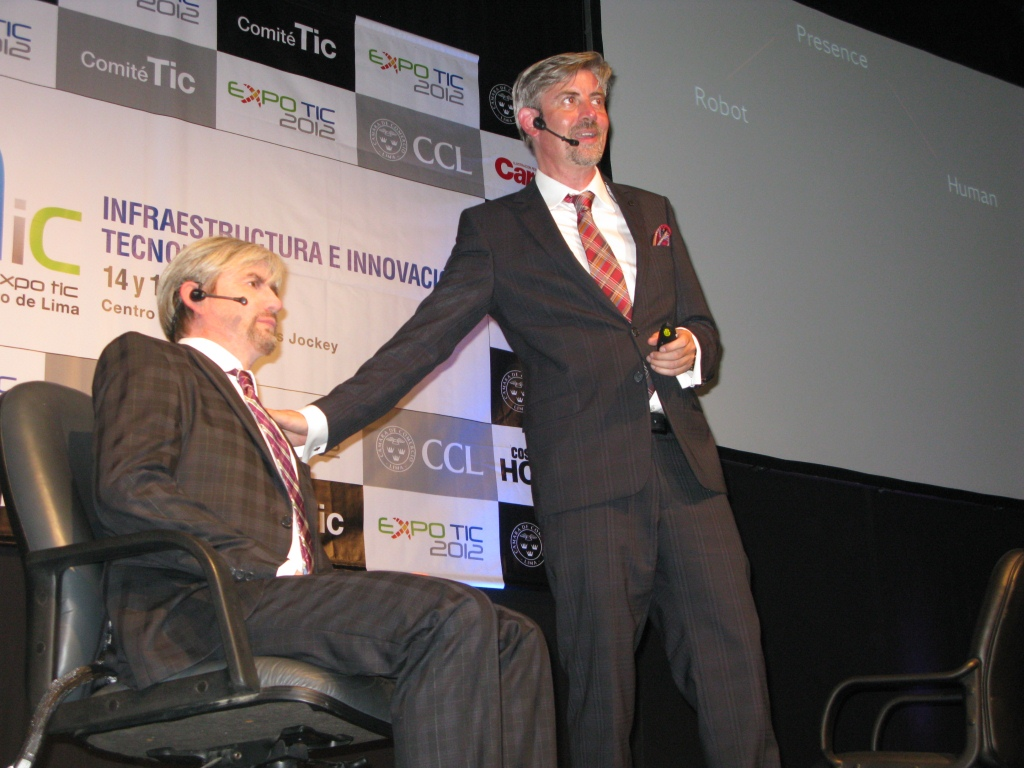
Geminoid-DK and Schärfe in 2012

Henrik Schärfe (born 1968) is a Danish former professor at Aalborg University, where he directed the Center for Computer-mediated Epistemology within the Department of Communication and Psychology at Aalborg University.

He has been known through the Hiroshi Ishiguro-inspired and Kokoro-built robot Geminoid-DK, built to resemble himself. The Geminoid-DK project landed him on the Time top 100 list of the most influential people in 2012.
