= Pascal Madeleine =

Pascal Madeleine is a professor in sports science and ergonomics at the Department of Health Science and Technology at Aalborg University.

Pascal Madeleine holds a Master of Science degree in Medical Technology and a DEA in bio-signal treatment from the Paul Sabatier University and the Paris 12 Val de Marne University.

In 1998, he was awarded the PhD degree and, in 2010, he became a professor in sports science and ergonomics. In 2010, Pascal Madeleine defended his higher doctoral dissertation and was awarded the Danish higher doctoral degree. In 2015, he completed the Pasteur Program on corporate governance at Harvard Business School. He is head of a research interest group on physical activity and human performance.
