= Kim Guldstrand Larsen =

Danish computer scientist

Kim Guldstrand Larsen R.
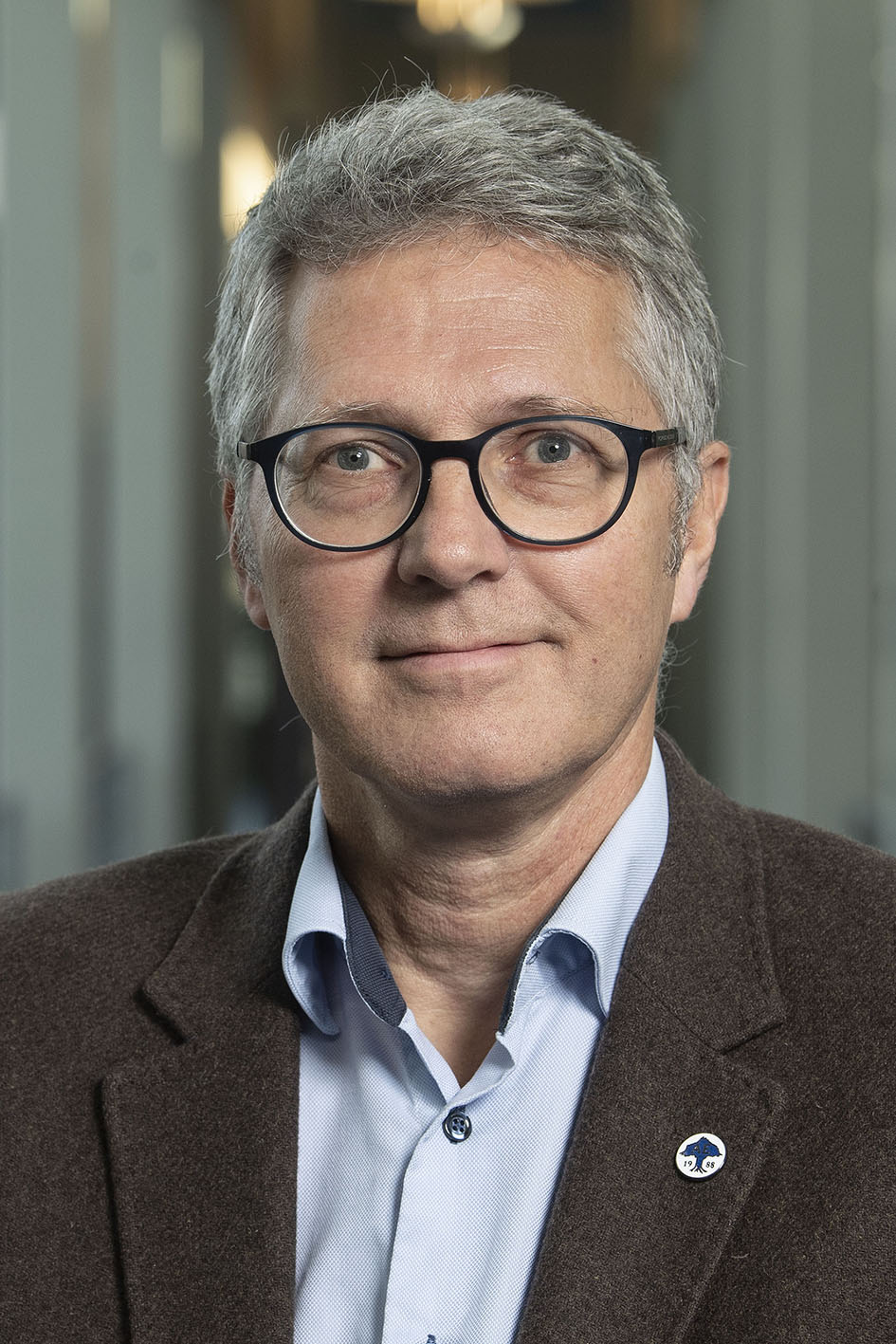
- Born: 23 December 1957 (age 68); Aalborg Denmark
- Education: University of Edinburgh (PhD); Aalborg University (MSc)
- Known for: Verification of Real-time computing in embedded systems
- Spouse: Merete Kruse Hansen
- Children: 2 daughters
- Awards: CAV Award; CONCUR Test of Time Award
- Scientific career
- Fields: Computer science
- Workplaces: Aalborg University
- Website: https://vbn.aau.dk/en/persons/103881

Kim Guldstrand Larsen R. (born 1957) is a Danish scientist and professor of computer science at Aalborg University, Denmark. His field of research includes modeling, validation and verification, performance analysis, and synthesing of real-time, embedded, and cyber-physical systems utilizing and contributing to concurrency theory and model checking. Within this domain, he has been instrumental in the invention and continuous development of one of the most widely used verification tools, and has received several awards and honors for his work.

== Education ==
Larsen has an MSc in mathematics from Aalborg University, 1982. In 1986, he received his PhD in Computer Science from University of Edinburgh, advised by Robin Milner.

== Career ==
Since 1993, Larsen has been a professor in Computer Science at Aalborg Universitet. He has also been a visiting professor at several places around the world, including the National Institute for Research in Digital Science and Technology (INRIA) (as an international chair 2016-2020).

Larsen heads the Center for Embedded Software Systems (CISS). From 2007 to 2011, he was director of the university-industry consortium Danish Network of Embedded Systems (DaNES), and from 2011 to 2017, he was the Danish co-lead of the Danish-Chinese Center for IDEA4CPS: Foundations for Cyber-Physical Systems, established by the Danish National Research Foundation and the Natural Science Foundation of China (NSFC).

In addition, he was director of the Danish ICT Innovation Network (InfinIT) from 2009 to 2020, director of the Center for Data-Intensive Cyber-Physical Systems (DiCyPS) funded by Innovation Fund Denmark from 2015 to 2021, and head of project on the Learning, Analysis, Synthesis, and Optimization of Cyber-Physical Systems (LASSO) project from 2015 to 2020, funded by an ERC Advanced Grant.

Larsen is one of the key figures behind the award-winning tool UPPAAL, which is one of the most widely used tools for the verification of real-time models. "UPPAAL in a Nutshell," written by Larsen and colleagues, is one of the most cited papers in The Journal Software Tools for Technology Transfer, published by Springer (citation rank in the 99th percentile).

He is a member of Royal Danish Academy of Sciences and Letters and elected fellow and digital expert (vismand) in the Danish Academy of Technical Sciences. He has served as the national expert for the Information and Communication Technology theme under the EU's 7th Framework Programme (FP7-ICT), and currently he is a member of the Digital, Industry, and Space referencegroup that serves the Danish Ministry of Higher Education and Science in connection to the EU Horizon Europe program.

== Awards and honors (selected) ==
- Honorary Doctor (Honoris causa), Uppsala University, 1999
- Honorary Doctor (Honoris causa), École normale supérieure Paris-Saclay (formerly École normale supérieure de Cachan), Paris, 2007
- Thomson Scientific Award as the most cited Danish computer scientist 1990-2004
- Knight of the Order of the Dannebrog, 2007
- Member of Academia Europaea
- CAV Award 2013
- ERC Advanced Grant, 2015
- Grundfos Prize 2016
- Foreign Expert of China, Distinguished Professor, Northeastern University, 2018
- Villum Investigator 2021 (30 M DKK) from Villum Foundation
- CONCUR Test of Time award 2022

== Selected works ==
Larsen has published six books (monographs) and more than 400 peer-reviewed papers and he has been cited many times (Google Scholar Citation Tracker). Selected works:

- Larsen, K. G.; Skou, A. (1991). "Bisimulation through probabilistic testing. Information and computation". Information and Computation. 94 (1): 1–28. doi:10.1016/0890-5401(91)90030-6.
- UPPAAL in a Nutshell, 1997
- Cassez, F.; Larsen, K.G (2000). Palamidessi, C. (ed.). The Impressive Power of Stopwatches. CONCUR 2000 - Concurrency Theory 11th International Conference. Lecture Notes in Computer Science. Berlin: Springer. pp. 138–152. doi:10.1007/3-540-44618-4_12. ISBN 9783540446187. Archived from the original (PDF) on 2023-07-08.
- Aceto, L.; Ingólfsdóttir, A.; Larsen, K.G.; Srba, J. (2007). Reactive systems: modelling, specification and verification. Cambridge University Press. ISBN 9780521875462.
- Larsen, K.G.; Benveniste, A.; Caillaud, B.; Nickovic, D.; Passerone, R.; Raclet, J.-B.; Reinkemeier, P.; Sangiovanni-Vincentelli, A.; Damm, W.; Henzinger, T.A. (2008). Contracts for System Design. Now Foundations and Research. doi:10.1561/1000000053. ISBN 978-1-68083-403-1.
- David, A.; Larsen, K.G.; Legay, A.; Mikučionis, M.; Bøgsted Poulsen, D. (2015). "Uppaal SMC tutorial". TidsskriftInternational Journal on Software Tools for Technology Transfer. 17 (4): 397–415. doi:10.1007/s10009-014-0361-y.
- Mao, H.; Chen, Y.; Jaeger, M.; Nielsen, T.D.; Larsen, K.G.; Nielsen, B. (2016). "Learning deterministic probabilistic automata from a model checking perspective". Machine Learning. 105 (2): 255–299. doi:10.1007/s10994-016-5565-9.
- Furber, R.; Kozen, D.; Larsen, K.G.; Mardare, R.; Panangaden, P. (2017). "Unrestricted stone duality for Markov processes". 2017 32nd Annual ACM/IEEE Symposium on Logic in Computer Science (LICS). IEEE Symposium on Logic in Computer Science (LICS). IEEE Press. doi:10.1109/LICS40289.2017.
- Tappler, M.; Aichernig, Bernhard K.; Bacci, G.; Eichlseder, M.; Larsen, K.G. (2019). "L*-Based Learning of Markov Decision Processes". Formal Methods – The Next 30 Years. International Symposium on Formal Methods. Springer. pp. 651–669. arXiv:1906.12239. doi:10.1007/978-3-030-30942-8_38.
- Bacci, Giorgio; Bacci, Giovanni; Larsen, K.G.; Mardare, R. (2019). "Converging from branching to linear metrics on Markov chains" (PDF). Mathematical Structures in Computer Science. 29 (1): 3–37. doi:10.1017/S0960129517000160. S2CID 15996500.
