= Gunhild Moltesen Agger =

Danish academic (born 1945)

- Born: 18 March 1945 (age 81); Viby Jylland, Denmark
- Citizenship: Denmark
- Education: Aarhus University
- Scientific career
- Fields: Danish media history
- Workplaces: Aalborg University

Gunhild Moltesen Agger (born 18 March 1945) is a professor in Danish media history at Aalborg University. She conducts research in media science, focusing on Danish television drama and film, crime fiction and national identity in a globalized world.

== Educational background ==
Agger received her MA in literary history from Aarhus University in 1971 with a thesis on the works of Leo Tolstoy. As a postgraduate student, Agger spent a semester at the Russian Academy of Sciences. Agger finished her postgraduate fellowship at Aarhus University in 1972.

In 2005, Agger was awarded her doctorate for her thesis on Danish TV- drama, Arvesølv og underholdning (Family silver and entertainment). Professor Ib Bondebjerg, University of Copenhagen, called her thesis a major quality leap in Danish TV research.

== Personal background ==
Agger's mother is author Ragnhild Agger (born on 25 January 1918), who has written novels, short stories and poetry on women's life in a social and realistic perspective.

In 1974, Agger was hired at Aalborg University to teach Danish and Media Studies. Since then, Agger has been a member of the university board (2003–2007), a dean (1983–1984) and a pro-dean (1982–1983).

Agger has been a guest lecturer at Old Dominion University in the United States, the University of Greenland, the University of Iceland, Vilnius University and many Danish and Scandinavian universities. She is affiliated with the University of Copenhagen and Aarhus University as an external co-examiner.

== Academic work ==
Agger has contributed to Danish media interpretations of themes within both fiction and journalism. She has explained how streaming services have advanced due to their ability to act both nationally and globally, whereas the DVD medium remains as a guarantor of the "safe choice".

Agger has been involved in the debate about the Danish TV series Badehotellet (The Seaside Hotel) and the reason for its success. While the debate on Badehotellet was running, Agger gave interviews to other media outlets, explaining the qualities of the TV series.

From 2010 to 2016, Agger chaired a crime research project at Aalborg University, co-editing with Kim Toft Hansen a six-volume book series. In this series, Agger wrote the book Mord til tiden (Timely Murder) (2013), which investigates historical crime fiction and crime documentary. Professor Kirsten Drotner wrote about this work: "The book demonstrates an impressive overview of a very large volume of material and does so with a sense of national and epochal contexts."

In 2010, with Anne Marit Waade, Agger published Den skandinaviske krimi – bestseller og blockbuster (Scandinavian Crime – bestseller and blockbuster).

Since 2014, Agger has participated in the research project "What Makes Danish TV Drama Series Travel?", investigating the international success of Danish TV dramas. In connection with this project, she has published the following:

- "The development of transnationality in Danish Noir – from Unit One to The Team" (2016), in Northern Lights, volume 14: Television drama in the age of media convergence
- "Nordic Noir – Location, Identity and Emotion" (2016), in Alberto N. Garcia (ed.): Emotions in Contemporary TV Series. Palgrave Macmillan.

== Organizations ==
Agger was a board member (2003–2006) and deputy chair (2005–2006) of the Association of Media Researchers in Denmark, a member of the Danish Council for Independent Research Humanities (now FKK) 1997–2003, of the Research Committee of the Danish Ministry of Culture (1999–2003), and a member of the Prime Minister's Media Committee (1994–1996). Agger is a member of the advisory board of the Journal of Scandinavian Cinema and of the Scientific Committee of the Journal Series. Agger is also a member of Det Danske Kriminalakademi (the Danish Crime Academy), whose purpose is to promote good Danish crime literature.

== Honors ==
In 2015, Agger was awarded the Danish Order of Dannebrog.

== Publications ==
- "Geopolitical location and plot in The Night Manager" (2017), in Journal of Scandinavian Cinema, 7:1, pp. 27–42, doi: 10.1386/jsca.7.1.27_1
- "Auteurteori og Sorg og glæde" (2016), in Jørgen Riber Christensen og Steen Ledet Christiansen (red.): Filmanalyse. Aarhus: Systime Academic.
- "Strategies in Danish film culture – and the case of Susanne Bier" (2015), in Kosmorama No. 259
- "Imagined Places. Location in Lars von Trier Films in the Perspective of Carl Th. Dreyer and Andrey Tarkovsky" (2015), in Non-Place: Representing Placelessness in Literature, Media and Culture Edited by Mirjam Gebauer et al.

Agger has contributed to the following books:

- Dansk mediehistorie (Danish Media History) (1996–1997)
- Dansk TV's history (The History of Danish TV) (2006)
- MedieDK (2010)
- Og Analyse af billedmedier (Analysis of Picture Media) (3rd edition 2015).

Agger is a main editor of the Medie- og Kommunikationsleksikon (Media and Communication Encyclopedia) (2009).
