= AAU Faculty of Health Sciences =

Faculty of Medicine at Aalborg University, Denmark

The Faculty of Medicine at Aalborg University is one of five faculties at AAU. Faculty of Medicine consists of a single department: The department of Medicine and Biomedical Engineering was founded in 2010, with approximately 750 students and 150 employees.

== Establishment ==
The Faculty of Medicine was established on 1 September 2010 and is the youngest and newest faculty at Aalborg University.

== Head ==
It is headed by Dean Egon Toft.

== Departments under Faculty of Health Sciences ==
- Department of Medicine and Health Technology
- Department of Learning and Philosophy

== The programs under Faculty of Health Sciences ==
Bachelor programs

- Sports
- Medicine
- Medicine with Industrial Specialization
- Health Technology

Master programs

- Sport
- Sports Technology
- Clinical Science and Technology
- Medicine
- Medicine with Industrial Specialization
- Health Technology
