= Arnulf Kolstad =

Norwegian social psychologist (1942–2020)

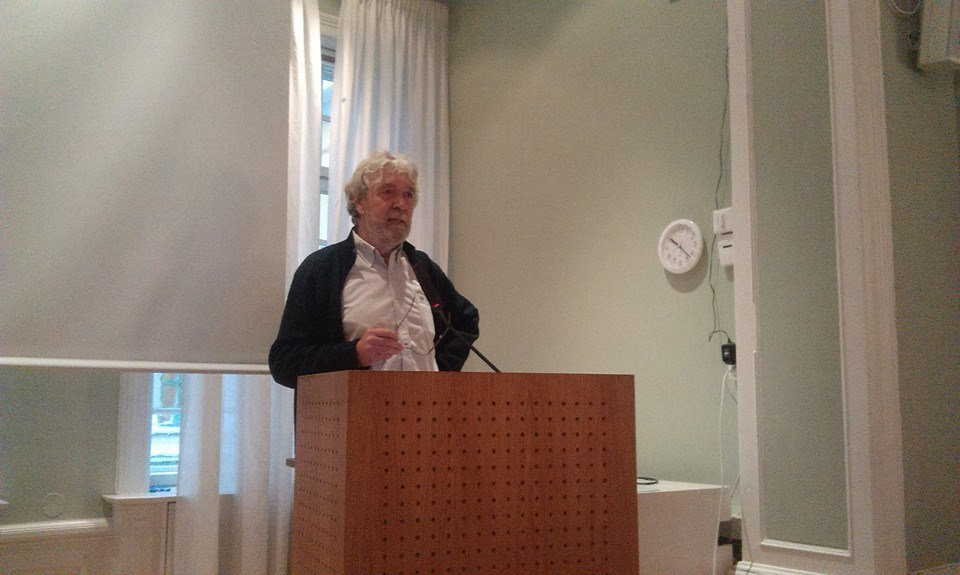
- Arnulf Kolstad (2014)
- Born: 23 April 1942
- Died: 21 May 2020 (aged 78)
- Occupation: Professor emeritus of social psychology
- Employer: Norwegian University of Science and Technology

Arnulf Kolstad (23 April 1942 – 21 May 2020) was a Norwegian social psychologist. He was professor emeritus of Social Psychology at the Norwegian University of Science and Technology (NTNU). He was appointed by the King-in-Council at the then-University of Trondheim in 1986 and was head of department for the Department of Psychology from 1990 to 1992. He became professor emeritus in 2012.

== Career ==
Kolstad was born in Oslo. He held a higher degree in engineering from 1966 and a doctorate in engineering from 1973, as well as a higher doctorate of philosophy (dr.philos.) in social psychology from 1984. As a student, he served as editor-in-chief of the student newspaper Under Dusken in Trondheim. He was also a member of the Trondheim city council for the Socialist People's Party during this period. He was employed at the University of Bergen from 1972, where he became associate professor of social psychology in 1976. From 1978, he was associate professor at Aalborg University, before his appointment by the Norwegian government as a full professor at the University of Trondheim. He has also been research director at the Research Council of Norway.

Kolstad was a well-known figure nationally, and often participated in public debates relating to his fields of expertise. His research focus is social psychology, cultural psychology, political psychology, environmental psychology, ecological psychology, and mental health.

His criticism of the 2010 Nobel Peace Prize being awarded to Liu Xiaobo as "western arrogance" received significant media attention in Norway and abroad.

== Selected books ==
- Kolstad, A. (2011) Menneskets kultur. Om kulturpsykologi og sosialpsykologi, 236 pp. Fidus forlag 978-82-998746-0-1
- Kolstad, A. (2011) Det vakre og det gode. Om estetikk og arkitektur, 228 pp. Fidus forlag 978-82-998746-1-8
- Kolstad, A. (2011) Fra kritikk til karriere. Om universitetet og de intellektuelle, 230 pp. Fidus forlag 978-82-998746-2-5
- Kolstad, A. (2011) Forbrytelse – men straff? Om kriminalitet og kriminalomsorg, 264 pp. Fidus forlag 978-82-998746-3-2
- Kolstad, A. (2011) Etter regn kommer sol. Om psykiske lidelser og helse, 270 pp. Fidus forlag 978-82-998746-4-9
- Kolstad, A. (2011) Fantasi og kunnskap. Om kreativitet og skole, 214 pp. Fidus forlag 978-82-998746-5-6
- Kolstad, A. (2011) Pengene og arbeidslivet. Om økonomi og lønnsarbeid, 221 pp. Fidus forlag 978-82-998746-6-3
- Kolstad, A. (2011) I sportsidiotenes verden. Om idrett og samfunn, 209 pp. Fidus forlag 978-82-998746-7-0
- Kolstad, A. (2011) Krig og fred. Om politisk psykologi og rasisme, 253 pp. Fidus forlag 978-82-998746-8-7
- Kolstad, A. (2011) Hummer og kanari. Om litt av hvert, 245 pp. Fidus forlag 978-82-998746-9-4
- Kolstad, A. & Krogstad, R. (eds.) (2011) Psykologisering av sosiale problemer. Medikalisering av psykiske lidelser. Alpha Forlag.
- Myers, D., Abell, J., Kolstad, A. & Sani, F. (2010) Social Psychology. European Edition. McGraw-Hill. 864 sider
- Kolstad, A. (1976) Nei, vi elsker : Politisk militærnekting 193 pp. (Pax-bøkene; 107)
