= Dorte Hammershøi =

Dorte Hammershøi is a Danish professor at the Department of Electronic Systems at Aalborg University. She works in the field of human sound perception, with special reference to electro-acoustic applications, including audiometric calibration, oto-acoustic emissions, hearing damage, spatial hearing, and measurement of noise sources close to the ear.

== Education ==
Hammershøi received her Master of Science in Electrical Engineering with specialization in biomedical engineering from Aalborg University in 1989. In 1995, she was awarded a PhD in acoustics for her work on binaural techniques.

== Awards and Grants ==
Over the years, Hammershøi has received several awards and grants. She has been the grant holder of three EU collaborations, of which one (FP7 BEAMING) concluded in 2014. In 2016, she was presented with the AES Board of Governors Award.
