= Anja Joergensen =

Danish urban sociologist

Anja Jørgensen
- Born: Anja Jørgensen, 1956 (age 69–70)
- Citizenship: Denmark
- Education: Aalborg University (MA) and (Ph.D.)
- Employer: Aalborg University

Anja Jørgensen (born 1969) is a Danish professor of urban sociology at Aalborg University.

== Education ==
In 1997 Jørgensen completed her MA in Sociology at Aalborg University.

In 2003 she received her PhD in Sociology.

== Career and research projects ==
Throughout her career, Jørgensen has mainly worked on various urban sociological issues relating location, local communities and mobility. She has been the leader of and participant in several externally funded research projects in her field. Jørgensen is the research leader of the research group, SocMap, at the Department of Sociology, and Social work at Aalborg University. Here, research is done regarding location, territorial inequality, local communities and local social integration.

Additionally, Jørgensen is part of the COHSMO project, which addresses and examines the relationship between territorial inequality and social cohesion. The project is supported by the EU's Horizon 2020 research and innovation program.
