= AAU Faculty of Social Sciences =

Faculty at Aalborg University in Denmark

The Faculty of Social Sciences at Aalborg University is one of five faculties at AAU. The Faculty is headed by Dean Rasmus Antoft in collaboration with Associate Dean Søren Kristiansen. The Faculty of Social Science offers a wide range of educations within areas as social science, economy, politics, organization, law, sociology, criminology etc. The palette of opportunities is widely based, but common for all the educations is their focus on the world, which is surrounding us.

== Departments ==
- Department of Business and Management
- Department of Culture and Global Studies
- Department of Law
- Department of Learning and Philosophy
- Department of Political Science
- Department of Sociology and Social Work

== Bachelor Programs in English ==
- Economics and Business Administration

== Master Programs in English ==
- China and International Relations
- Chinese Area Studies
- Development and International Relations
- European Studies
- Global Gender Studies
- Global Refugee Studies
- Latin American Studies
- Innovation, Knowledge and Economic Dynamics
- Innovation, Knowledge and Entrepreneurial Dynamics
- Innovation Management
- International Business Economics
- International Marketing
