= Vladimir Bouchler =

Uzbekistani theatre director

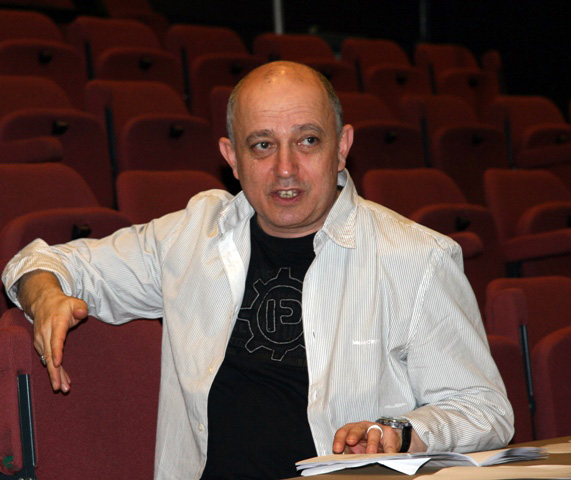
- Vladimir Bouchler at rehearsals in Oslo, Norway, 2009
- Born: October 1, 1954 (age 72); Tashkent, Uzbekistan
- Occupations: Theatre and film director

Vladimir Bouchler is a theatre director, film director and pedagogue of acting and directing in theatre and film.

== Biography ==
After starting life as an electric engineer in Soviet Union's Republic of Uzbekistan, Vladimir headed to The Ostrovsky Theatre School in Tashkent to study for five years as an actor. This was followed by a further five years training and practice as a director in the Boris Shchukin Theatre Institute MA, in Moscow. Since then Vladimir has worked as an independent director, worldwide.

== Professional life ==
=== ADMINISTRATIVE AND ACADEMIC POSITIONS ===
- Artistic director of the International Festival "Week of Theatre Methods" (Brussels)
- Artistic director, producer of the European Theatre and Film Institute
- Professor, Head of acting department, MTHS The Norwegian College of Musical Theatre (Norway)
- CEO of Saraton International Street Theatre and Film Festival in Tashkent (Uzbekistan)

=== Theatre professor ===
1999–present

- Guest Professor of MA Creative Practices & Direction in Guildford School of Acting, Guildford, UK
- Guest Professor of Directing department in Central Academy of Drama, Beijing, China
- Professor of acting department School of Musical Theatre, Oslo, Norway, Musikkteaterhøyskolen
- Workshop leader of DA / Dancing Actor methodology in the Institute for Contemporary Dance of the Folkwang University of the Arts
- Workshop leader, Music Theatre Master ArtEZ Institute of the Arts Arnhem, Netherlands
- Workshop leader in ÉCOLE SUPÉRIEURE DES ARTS ACADEMY OF ARTS, Mons, Belgium
- Research leader of Educational Theatre Research Project, aiming at practical analysis of the interlingual, multicultural, interdisciplinary approach in contemporary theatre making (conditional title: ”Het doorbreken van de muur”) in School of Arts | Koninklijk Conservatorium Brussel, Belgium
- Lecturer of acting in the Opera Department of Folkwang University of the Arts
- Lecturer of acting in the Opera Department of Royal Conservatory of Brussels
- Guest Professor of BA Drama in University of Manchester, UK
- Lecturer of acting in non-naturalistic performance styles University of Salford, UK
- Lecturer of film directing/acting Manchester Metropolitan University, UK
- Professor of directing School of stage design La Cambre Brussels
- Professor of acting in the Theatre Conservatory of Bordeaux, France
- Professor of acting in the circus school of Belgium
- Leader of the yearly Chekhov’s intensive workshop Drama Department University of Wales
- Master of Chekhov’s Creative Theatre Atelier in Brussels (Belgium)
- Screen Academy Mentor in the University of Wales, Newport
- Leader of the intensive acting course Deutsches Zentrum für Schauspiel Cologne
- Master of acting course ArtEZ Theatre school Arnhem NL
- Guest professor / director KHiO Theatre School Oslo Norway
- Guest professor Musik og Teaterhøjskolen, Denmark
- Guest professor LASALLE College of the Arts, Singapore
- Guest professor USM, Penang, The School of Communication's/ Malaysia
- Guest professor ASWARA Film Faculty/Malaysia/ Kuala Lumpur
- Guest professor Chulalongkorn University, The Faculty of Communication Arts/Bangkok Thailand
- Guest professor Aalborg University Department of Communication /Denmark
- Guest professor Bristol Old Vic Theatre School/ UK
- Guest professor University of Tampa Film and Media Arts Department, Florida/ USA
- Guest professor Coastal Carolina University Department of Theatre, SC/ USA
- Workshop leader Cygnet New Theatre, Exeter UK
- Workshop leader Omma Studio and school, Crete, Greece

=== Theatre director ===
1979–present selected titles

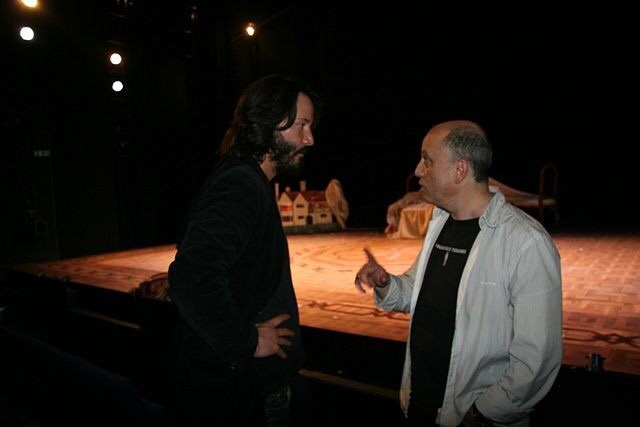
Vladimir Bouchler and Keanu Reeves on the rehearsal of "The Cherry Orchard" by Anton Chekhov in Scotland (2009)

- "Pendulum" — musical creation based on short stories of O' Henry (Tashkent, Uzbekistan)
- "Attention, spring!" — by A. Chekhov (Tashkent, Uzbekistan)
- "Ring around the moon" — by J. Anouilh (Tashkent, Uzbekistan)
- "Escape Attempt" — on the base of science fiction novel of brothers Strugatsky; the show was set as a synthesis of modern ballet, dramatic theatre and modern visual effects.
- "The Five" — by A. Obraztsov, performance dedicated to World War II
- "Poor Soso Jugashvilly" — by V. Korkia (Tashkent, Uzbekistan)
- "Dialogues" — five one act plays of "new wave" playwrights from Russia (Tashkent, Uzbekistan)
- "The Devil in Love" — by N. Sadur (Tashkent, Uzbekistan)
- Vassa Zheleznova by M. Gorky (Tashkent, Uzbekistan)
- "Nothing" – an improvisation show (Besançon, France)
- "H2O and 4 women", modern ritual show has toured Europe and Asia and was presented more than 100 times in front of the international public.
- "Children of October" (Grenoble, France)
- "Quai Ouest" – by B.–M. Koltes (Belgium)
- "7 wife’s of Blue Beard" – by A. Volodine (Belgium)
- "All at once" – by Y. Grishkovetz (UK, Belgium)
- "Galleries" by J. Hewitt (London, UK)
- "Ordinary miracle" by E. Shvarts (Iceland)
- "Three sisters" by A. Chekhov (Aberystwyth, Wales)
- "The Elder Son" by A. Vampilov (Manchester, UK)
- "Man without purpose" by A. Lygre (Stavanger, Norway)
- "Closer" by P. Marber (KHiO, Oslo, Norway)
- The Cherry Orchard by A. Chekhov (Dundee Rep, Scotland)
- "Invisible theatre babylon" – creation project in theatre and film
- "Uncle Vanya" – Beaivváš Sámi Theatre, Norway
- "The Foreigner" by Larry Shue, NSKI, Oslo, Norway
- "Side by Side by Sondheim" by Stephen Sondheim, MTHS, Oslo, Norway
- Oklahoma! by Oscar Hammerstein II and Richard Rodgers, Galati, Romania; MTHS, Oslo, Norway
- "Moliere. Moliere" creation based on the extracts of Molière comedies, Ateliers ULB, Brussels, Belgium
- "Briser Le Mur!" creation based on three-lingual acting collaboration between three communities in Belgium, Espace Senghor, Brussels, Belgium
- "The Final Circle of Paradise" – based on science fiction novel of brothers Strugatsky (ETFI, Brussels)

=== Special projects ===
1991–present

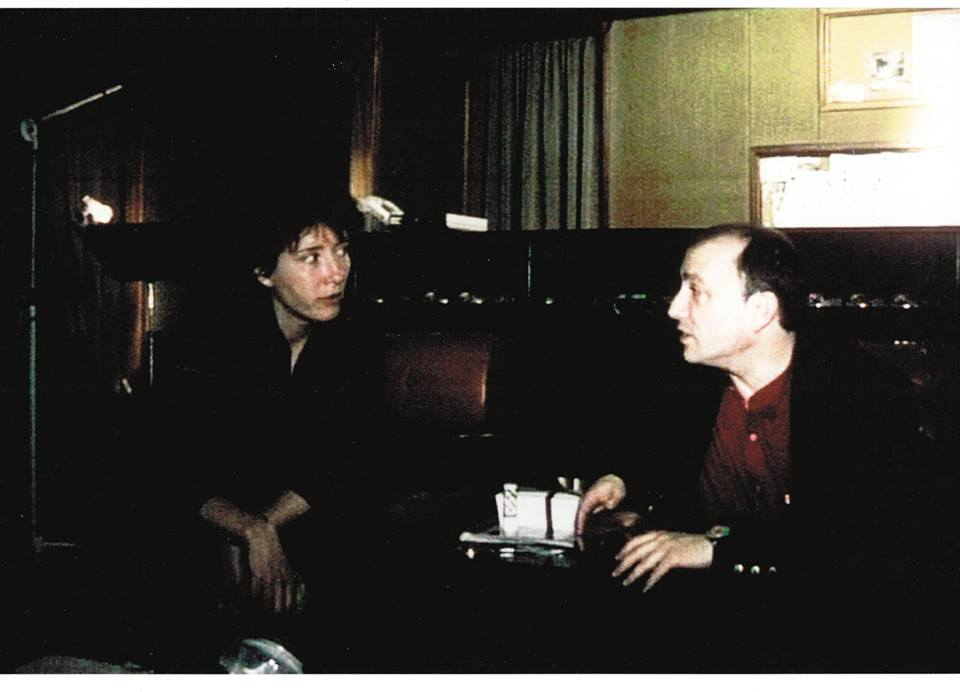
Vladimir Bouchler and Emma Thompson, while working on narration of the documentary film "DRY TEARS. Aral Sea Legend", London (1998)

- Leader of the Aral Sea project – project designed to draw world attention to the problem of the Aral Sea using theatre, cinema, TV, and photographic exhibitions (in France, Germany, Italy, Denmark, Sweden, the United Kingdom, Spain, Portugal, Poland, Switzerland, Turkey, Kazakhstan and Uzbekistan). The street theatre performance "H2O+4women" and video action, including the documentary film "Dry Tears. Aral Sea Legend" were created with the participation of Emma Thompson, Annie Girardot, Erland Josephson, Michel Crespin, Timur Bekmambetov and others.

2016–present

- Co-founder of European Theatre and Film Institute
- Co-founder of Brussels Cinema Lab

1991–1998

- Director of "Children of October", creation, toured 12 countries, dedicated to the disappearance of the USSR. It was created with the use of 100,000 "Oktyabr icons" (badges with the image of Lenin-child, worn by children in the USSR)

1995–1999

- Director of "GAIA", creation, toured 7 countries. In Greek mythology, Gaia is the personification of the Earth. The play was performed with soil, brought to Europe from 15 republics of the former Soviet Union. The actors performed people who suddenly lost their homeland due to various national conflicts.

1989–1994

- CEO of Saraton Theatre and Film Festival in Tashkent (Uzbekistan)

=== Film director/actor ===
- 1991 "Mission N1" – creative documentary with participation of Erland Josephson (lead actor of Ingmar Bergman, Peter Brook)
- 1998 "Dry Tears" documentary legend (with narration of Emma Thompson) — director, cinematographer "Les Larmes Sèches" with narration of Annie Girardot
- 2004 "CO/MA" actor in Mike Figgis & European Film Academy project

== Professional education ==
=== Theatre and film acting ===
- Tashkent State Institute for Dramatic Art

=== Theatre directing ===
- Boris Shchukin Theatre Institute (Moscow)

=== Film directing and acting ===
- course "Six Actors In Search Of A Director" — workshop by Krzysztof Kieślowski in Amsterdam 1994
- acting in Mike Figgis & European Film Academy project "CO/MA" How to Combine Vision And Craft And Make a Film in One Week 2004
- Anthony Dod Mantle (EFA) master class in Berlin "Developing a Personal Visual Dictionary" 2005
- Stefan Jarl (EFA) master class in Brandenburg July 2006
