= Centre for Comparative Welfare Studies =

Research group at Aalborg University

Centre for Comparative Welfare Studies Center for Sammenlignende Velfærdsstudier
- Established: 1995
- Research type: Multidisciplinary research group
- Director: Jørgen Goul Andersen
- Faculty: Department of Economics, Politics and Public Administration
- Website: www.en.politics-society.aau.dk/research/research-groups/ccws/

Centre for Comparative Welfare Studies (CCWS), Department of Economics, Politics and Public Administration, Aalborg University, (founded in 1995) is a multidisciplinary research group analyzing the functioning, challenges and patterns of change of contemporary welfare states. Focus is on comparative studies, or on the Danish and the Scandinavian welfare states in a comparative perspective. Basic research is the major research agenda, but group also conducts analyses that are relevant to current policy debates.

The research centre is run by Professor in Political Sociology Jørgen Goul Andersen.
