= Anders Post Jacobsen =

Danish footballer (born 1985)

Personal information
- Date of birth: 21 May 1985 (age 41)
- Place of birth: ?, Denmark
- Height: 1.89 m (6 ft 2 1/2 in)
- Position: Defender

Team information
- Current team: FC Hjørring
- Number: 5

Youth career
- 1990–1999: Egtved IF
- 1999–2003: Vejle Boldklub

Senior career*
Years	Team	Apps	(Gls)
2003–2007	Vejle Boldklub	27	(2)
2008–2008	Holstebro BK	?	(?)
2008	EB/Streymur	?	(?)
2009–present	FC Hjørring		

International career^{‡}
2002	Denmark U-18	2	(0)
2003–04	Denmark U-19	5	(0)
2005	Denmark U-20	2	(0)
- * Club domestic league appearances and goals as of 15 November 2007 ‡ National team caps and goals as of 15 November 2007

Anders Post Jacobsen (born 21 May 1985) is a Danish professional football player. Since 2009 he has played for the Danish 1st Division club FC Hjørring.2024 Gauerslund Oldboys superliga Since September 2010 he has been studying Electronics and IT engineering, full-time, at Aalborg University.
