= Malene Freudendal-Pedersen =

Urban planning professor and researcher

- Citizenship: Denmark
- Education: Roskilde University (BA), (MA) and (PhD)
- Employer: Aalborg University

Malene Freudendal-Pedersen is professor of urban planning at Aalborg University and has an interdisciplinary background linking sociology, geography, urban planning and the sociology of technology. Her research has been strongly inspired by the mobilities turn.

== Background ==
Previously, her work has primarily focused on investigating everyday life praxes of mobilities. Furthermore, she is the author of the book 'Mobility in Daily life – between Freedom and Unfreedom' in which she focuses on the importance of comprehending the interrelations between praxis, technologies and societies. Currently, her focus is on understanding the interrelation between spatial and digital mobilities and its impacts on everyday life communities, societies and cities. For many years she has been co-organizing the International Cosmobilities Network linking mobilities researcher's in Europe and beyond. She is the co-founder and co-editor of the Routledge journal Applied Mobilities as well as the co-founder and Co-editor of the Book-series 'Networked Urban Mobilities' also at Routledge.

== Education ==
Malene Freudendal-Pedersen completed both her bachelor's degree in social science, master's degree in technology and social science and PhD in social science at Roskilde University, which she completed in 2007.

Currently, she is working as a professor in urban planning at Aalborg University.

== Selected research projects and tasks ==
2018 – (Ongoing): Partner, Jean Monnet Network – Cooperative, Connected Automated Mobility: EU and Australasian Innovations (CCAMEU) Funded by EU Erasmus+. WP leader for Smart and Livable Cities.

2015–2016: Project leader ‘German-Danish Mobility Research Collaboration’. Funded by ministry for Innovation and Research, Denmark.

2013–2015: Project leader ‘Mobilities Futures and the City’. Funded by The Mobile Lives Forum (SNCF), Paris, France

2012–2014: Researcher, ‘Urban Cycle Mobilities’. Funded by the Danish Council for Independent Research

2014–2015: Head of Planning Studies, Roskilde University

2009–2011: Researcher, ‘Scandria – The Scandinavian-Adriatic Corridor for Innovation and Growth’. Financed by EU, Framework 7

2003–2007: PhD research, ‘Structural Stories in Everyday life’. Funded by The Danish State Railways and Roskilde University

== Research honors ==
2016: Research Fellowship, HafenCity University Hamburg

2014: Distinguished visiting researcher, University of British Columbia

2005: Professor P.H. Bendtsen's Traffic Research Award

2004: Visiting Fellowship, The Graduate Center of the University of New York (CUNY)

== Selected publications and academic articles ==
=== Books ===
Freudendal-Pedersen, Malene & Sven Kesselring (2017) Exploring Networked Urban Mobilities – Theories, Concepts, Ideas – Volume 1. New York and London: Routledge

Freudendal-Pedersen, Malene et al. (2017) Experiencing Networked Urban Mobilities – Practices, Flows, Methods – Volume 2. New York and London: Routledge

Malene Freudendal-Pedersen, John Andersen, Lasse Kofoed and Jonas Larsen (2012) Byen i Bevægelse: Mobilitet, Politik, Performativitet. Frederiksberg: Roskilde Universitetsforlag.

Freudendal-Pedersen, Malene (2009) Mobility in daily life - between freedom and unfreedom. Farnham: Ashgate.

=== Articles ===
Freudendal-Pedersen, Malene, Sven Kesselring & Eriketti Servou (2019) What is Smart for the Future City – Mobilities and Automation. In Sustainability MDPI 11(221) 1–21

Freudendal-Pedersen, Malene & Sven Kesselring (2018) Sharing Mobilities. Some propaedeutic considerations. In Applied Mobilities 3(1) 1-7

Freudendal-Pedersen, Malene. et al. (2017) Interactive Environmental Planning – Creating Utopias and Storylines within a Mobilities Planning project. In Journal of Environmental Planning and Management 60(6) 941–958

Freudendal-Pedersen, Malene & Sven Kesselring (2016) Mobilities, Futures and the city: Repositioning discourses, Changing Perspectives, Rethinking Policies. In Mobilities 11(4) 573–584

Freudendal-Pedersen, Malene, Sven Kesselring & Kevin Hannam (2016) Applied Mobilities, Transitions and Opportunities. In Applied Mobilities 1(1) 1-9
