= Toke Reichstein =

Danish economist

- Born: 1970s

Academic background
- Education: Aalborg University

Toke Reichstein (born 1970s) is a Danish economist and Professor at Copenhagen Business School. He is best known for his work on "Investigating the sources of process innovation among UK manufacturing firms."

== Life and work ==
Reichstein has obtained his MSc in economics at Aalborg University in 1999, and his PhD in economics at the Aalborg University in 2003.

Reichstein served as a Research Associate at Imperial College Business School, Imperial College London from 2003 to 2006. In 2006, he transitioned to Copenhagen Business School. Initially as an associate professor in the Department of Industrial Economics and Strategy (later renamed the Department of Innovation and Organizational Economics). He was promoted to Professor in 2011. Reichstein later shifted his affiliation to the Department of Strategic Management and Globalisation, which eventually merged with his former department to form the Department of Strategy and Innovation.

Reichstein research interests focuses on entrepreneurship and economics of innovation.

== Selected publications ==
Articles

- Isakson, C. D., Dahl, M. S., & Reichstein, T., 2022, Residential location choices of an isolated workforce – Shifts in social attachment of former seafarers. Maritime Studies, ?(?) ?
- Reichstein, T., & Zichella, G., 2022, Students of entrepreneurship: S. Management Learning, ?(?) ?
- Boudreau, K. J., Jeppesen, L. B., Reichstein, T., & Rullani, F., 2021, Crowdfunding as Dona- tions to Entrepreneurial Firms. Research Policy, 50(7) 104264
- Feldman, M. P., Ozcan, S., & Reichstein, T., 2021, Variation in organizational practices: are startups really different? Journal of Evolutionary Economics, 31(1) 1–31
- Mahieu, J., Melillo, F., Reichstein, T., & Thompson, P., 2021, Shooting Stars? Uncertainty in Hiring Entrepreneurs. Strategic Entrepreneurship Journal, ?(?) ?–?
- Cervino, G. C., Moreira, S. L., & Reichstein, T., 2019, Licensing Decision: A Rent Dissipation Lens Applied to Product Market Competition, Openness to External Knowledge and Exogenous Sunk Costs. Industrial and Corporate Change, 28(4) 773–792
- Feldman, M. P., Halbinger, M., Reichstein, T., Valentin, F., & Yoon, J. W., 2019, Technological achievements in entrepreneurial firms ? legacy, value chain experience, and division of innovation labour. Industry and Innovation, 26(3) 243–268
- Feldman, M. P., Ozcan, S., & Reichstein, T., 2019, Falling not far from the tree: Entrepreneurs and organizational heritage. Organization Science, 30(2) 337–360
- Criscuolo, P., Laursen, K., Reichstein, T., & Salter, A. J., 2018, The Winning Combination Search Strategy and Innovativeness in the UK. Industry and Innovation, 25(2) 115– 143
- Failla, V., Melillo, F., & Reichstein, T., 2017, Entrepreneurship and employment stability — Job matching, labour market value, and personal commitmenteffects. Journal of Business Venturing, 32(2) 162–177
- Laursen, K., Moreira, S. L., Reichstein, T., & Leone, M. I., 2017, Evading the Boomerang Effect: Using the Grant-Back Clause to Further Generative Appropriability from Technology Licensing Deals. Organization Science, 28(3) 514–530
- Laursen, K., F., M., & Reichstein, T., 2016, A Matter of Location: The Role of Social Capital in Overcoming the Liability of Newness in R&D Activities. Regional Studies, 50(9) 1537– 1550
- Leone, M. I., Reichstein, T., Boccadelli, P., & Magnusson, M., 2016, License to Learn: An investigation into Thin and Thick Licensing Contracts. R&D Management, 46(2) 326– 340
- Leone, M. I., Oriani, R., & Reichstein, T., 2015, Uncertainty, Flexibility and Upfront Fees in Patent Licenses. Journal of Industrial and Business Economics, 42(4) 371–394
- Leone, M. I., & Reichstein, T., 2012, Licensing-in fosters rapid invention! the effect of the grant- back clause and technological unfamiliarity. Strategic Management Journal, 33(8) 965– 985
- Colombo, M. G., Rabbiosi, L., & Reichstein, T., 2011, Organizing for external knowledge sourcing. European Management Review, 8(3) 111–116
- Laursen, Keld, Toke Reichstein, and Ammon Salter. "Exploring the effect of geographical proximity and university quality on university–industry collaboration in the United Kingdom." Regional studies 45.4 (2011): 507–523.
- Colombo, M. G., Rabbiosi, L., & Reichstein, T., 2010, Special Issue on: Designing internal organization for external knowledge sourcing. European Management Review, 7(1) 74–76
- Ebersberger, B., Marsili, O., Reichstein, T., & Salter, A., 2010, Into thin air: using a quantile regression approach to explore the relationship between R&D and innovation. Inter- national Review of Applied Economics, 24(1) 95–102
- Reichstein, T., Dahl, M. S., Ebersberger, B., & Jensen, M. B., 2010, The devil dwells in the tails. Journal of Evolutionary Economics, 20(2) 219–231
- Özcan, S., & Reichstein, T., 2009, Transition to entrepreneurship from the public sector: Pre- dispositional and contextual effects. Management Science, 55(4) 604–618
- Ebersberger, B., Marsili, O., Reichstein, T., & Salter, A., 2008, Fortune favours the brave: The distribution of innovative returns in Finland, the Netherlands and the UK. Structural Change and Economic Dynamics, 19(4) 357–362
- Reichstein, T., Salter, A. J., & Gann, D. M., 2008, Break on through: sources and determi- nants of product and process innovation among UK construction firms. Industry and Innovation, 15(6) 601–625
- Dahl, Michael S., and Toke Reichstein. "Are you experienced? Prior experience and the survival of new organizations." Industry and Innovation 14.5 (2007): 497–511.
- Reichstein, Toke, and Ammon Salter. "Investigating the sources of process innovation among UK manufacturing firms." Industrial and Corporate Change 15.4 (2006): 653–682.
- Reichstein, T., & Jensen, M. B., 2005, Firm size and firm growth rate distributions—the case of Denmark. Industrial and Corporate Change, 14(6) 1145–1166
- Reichstein, T., Salter, A. J., & Gann, D. M., 2005, Last among equals: a comparison of innova- tion in construction, services and manufacturing in the UK. Construction Management and Economics, 23(6) 631–644
- Reichstein, T., & Dahl, M. S., 2004, Are firm growth rates random? Analysing patterns and dependencies. International Review of Applied Economics, 18(2) 225–246

Books

- Alkærsig, L., Beukel, K., & Reichstein, T., 2015, Intellectual Property Rights Management: Rookies, Dealers and Strategists, Palgrave Macmillan
- Christensen, J. L., Vinding, A. L., & Reichstein, T., 2006, Product Innovation in Denmark – Extend, Process, Learning and Economic Performance, Aalborg University Press
- Reichstein, T., 2003, Firm growth rate distributions, firm size distributions and the industry life cycle, Aalborg University Press
