= Carsten Greve =

Danish academic

Carsten Greve (born 1965 in Svendborg ) is a Danish professor at Copenhagen Business School. He is Ph.D in Political Science and Cand.scient.pol. from University of Copenhagen.

Greve has been a professor since 2006. He received his master's degree in political science in 1992, and earned his Ph.D. in political science in 1997 from the University of Copenhagen. He has been at CBS since 2004 and a full professor since 2010. From 2006 to 2010 he was professor with special responsibilities. From 1998to 2004 he was at the Department of Political Science, University of Copenhagen. In 1996–1997, he was at the Institute of Economics, Politics and Public Administration in Aalborg University in Denmark.

== Research areas ==
His main research areas are public-private partnerships and public management reform from an international perspective, including performance management, contracting, privatization, corporatization, regulatory reform and governance, which he has done research on over more than fifteen years. Greve has published monographs in Danish and English. He has published in international journals such as Public Administration Review, Governance, Public Administration, International Public Management Review and Public Management Review. Greve's current research focuses on public management and governance reforms and public-private partnerships. Together with Graeme Hodge, Monash University, Australia, and Anthony Boardman, Canada, Greve published an International Handbook on Public-Private Partnerships in 26 chapters. He was the local organizer of the International Research Society for Public Management's conference held in Copenhagen in April 2009. He has been an advisor to the Danish Ministry of Finance and the Danish National Audit Office.

Greve is chairman of the CEMS Interfaculty Group on Public Management and Governance, a pan-European research and teaching group.

His teaching responsibility is centered on courses on public management and governance. Since 2009, he has been the first academic director of the new flexible executive Master of Public Governance executive education program which Copenhagen Business School is offering together with the University of Copenhagen and Aalborg University and other partners and that has 600+ public managers enrolled. He is Academic Director of the new CBS Public-Private Platform. He co-organizes an annual program for Danish public sector top executives that take them to Washington DC. He currently supervises Ph.D. projects on strategic governance andpublic-private partnerships in the service sector and municipal waste sector.

== Publications ==
Books

- Carsten Greve; Reformanalyse: Hvordan den offentlige sektor grundlæggende er blevet forandret i 00'erne, Djøf / Jurist- og Økonomforbundet 2012.
- Graeme Hodge; Carsten Greve; Anthony Boardman / International Handbook on Public-Private Partnerships

Cheltenham: Edward Elgar Publishing, Incorporated 2010.

- Carsten Greve / Offentlig ledelse: Teorier og temaer i et politologisk perspektiv.

2. udg.ed.København : Djøf / Jurist- og Økonomforbundet 2009.

- Carsten Greve / Contracting for Public Services, London : Routledge 2007
- Carsten Greve; Niels Ejersbo / Contracts as Reinvented Institutions in the Public Sector : A Cross-Cultural Comparison. Westport, Conn. : Praeger Publishers 2005.
- Gavin Drewry; Carsten Greve; Thierry Tanquerel / Contracts, Performance Measurement and Accountability in the Public Sector

Amsterdam : IOS Press 2005

- Niels Ejersbo; Carsten Greve / Moderniseringen af den offentlige sektor, København : Børsen 2005
- Begivenhedsledelse og handlekraft. København: Børsens Forlag 2006.
- Graeme Hodge; Carsten Greve / The Challenge of Public-Private Partnerships : Learning from International Experience.

Cheltenham : Edward Elgar Publishing, Incorporated 2005.

Selected book chapters

- Carsten Greve; Graeme Hodge / Conclusions : Rethinking Public-private partnerships.

In: Rethinking Public-Private Partnerships: Strategies for Turbulent Times. . ed. /Carsten Greve; Graeme Hodge. Abingdon : Routledge 2013, p. 211-222.

- Graeme Hodge; Carsten Greve / Introduction : Public-private Partnership in Turbulent Times.

In: Rethinking Public-Private Partnerships: Strategies for Turbulent Times. . ed. /Carsten Greve; Graeme Hodge. Abingdon : Routledge 2013, p. 1-32.

- Carsten Greve / Konkurrencereformen og ledelsesstrategier

In: Ledelse efter kommunalreformen: Sådan tackles de nye udfordringer. . ed. /Jacob Torfing. København : Djøf / Jurist- og Økonomforbundet 2012, p. 123-142.

Selected papers

- Carsten Greve / Innovative and Collaborative Partnerships Between Universities and Government : The Case of the Executive Master of Public Governance Program in Copenhagen, Denmark: A co-operation between University of Copenhagen and Copenhagen Business School.

Paper presented at 2011 NASPAA Annual Conference, Kansas, USA. 2011

- Carsten Greve; Graeme Hodge / Theorizing Public-Private Partnership Success : A Market-Based Alternative to Government.

Paper presented at The 11th Annual Public Management Research Conference. 2011, Syracuse, USA. 2011

- Carsten Greve; Graeme Hodge / Transparency in Public-Private Partnerships : Some Lessons from Scandinavia and Australia.

Paper presented at 1st Global Conference on Transparency Research. 2011, Newark, USA. 2011

- Carsten Greve; Graeme Hodge; Anthony Boardman / Public-Private Partnerships : Recent International Experiences and Future Challenges for Research.

Paper presented at IRSPM Conference, København, Danmark. 2010

- Carsten Greve / Whatever Happened to New Public Management?

Paper presented at Danish Political Science Association Annual Meeting 2010, Vejle, Danmark. 2010

- Graeme Hodge; Carsten Greve / The PPP Debate : Taking Stock of the Issues and Renewing the Research Agenda.

Paper presented at The International Research Society for Public Management Conference, Brisbane, Australien. 2008
