= Lars Bo Ibsen =

Lars Bo Ibsen is a Danish professor in engineering at Aalborg University. His research revolves around soil mechanics and bearing capacity to develop foundations of wind turbines for off-shore use.

Ibsen developed the monopod bucket foundation, which allows the placing of large wind turbines on soft seabed without harming the wildlife and environment.

At Aalborg, Ibsen is head of research of the Geotechnical Engineering Research Group that focuses on “the geotechnical and hydraulic aspects related to offshore wind turbines, in particular regarding the design and development of foundations and models for the determination of forces from ocean waves and current.”
