= Torben Larsen =

Danish hydrologist

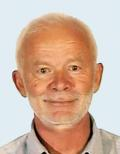
- Born: 1 May 1942; Copenhagen, Denmark
- Known for: Lukning af Thyborøn Kanal, Lærebog i Hydraulik (Text book in Hydraulics)
- Scientific career
- Fields: Water and Soil
- Workplaces: Technical University of Denmark, Aalborg Universitet, Vandbygningsvæsenets Direktorat

Torben Larsen (1 May 1942) is a noted Danish scientist working in the field of hydrology and water pollution.

== Biography ==
Torben Larsen was born in Copenhagen on 1 May 1942. He graduated with a degree in hydraulic engineering from the Polyteknisk Læreanstalt (Technical University of Denmark) in 1966.

From 1967 to 1969 Larsen worked for the Directorate for Hydraulic Engineering. In 1969 he moved to Aalborg to work for Danmarks Ingeniørakademi, later Aalborg University. In 1989 he was appointed Associate Professor and in 2001 Professor. In 2001 Torben Larsen defended his doctoral thesis about dilution of waste water in the coastal zone. Between 1997 and 2005 Larsen was a member of Statens Teknisk-videnskabelige Forskningsråd (the Danish Technical-Scientific Research Board).

Larsen has been working on the possibility of closing the Thyborøn channel in the Limfjorden to prevent flooding in the low coastal areas.
