= Anette Kolmos =

Danish academic (born 1956)

- Born: October 20, 1956 (age 69); Sønderborg, Denmark

Academic background
- Education: Aalborg University (MA) and (Ph.D.)

Academic work
- Discipline: Engineering education and Problem-based learning

Anette Kolmos is a Danish professor in engineering education and problem-based learning (PBL) at the Department of Planning at Aalborg University.

== Education ==
In 1984, Anette Kolmos got her MA in social science and psychology at Aalborg University. By 1989, she had completed her Ph.D. in technology and gender studies.

== Career and achievements ==
Since 2003, Anette Kolmos has been employed as a Professor of Engineering Education and Problem-based Learning at the Department of Planning at Aalborg University. The aim of her studies has, among other things, been to research and disseminate knowledge and information regarding problem-based learning to the rest of the world. For one thing, this resulted in Kolmos becoming the chairman of a UNESCO project on problem-based learning in 2007. Later, she was entrusted with the leadership of the only Danish UNESCO category 2 center: Aalborg Center for Problem Based Learning in Engineering, Science and Sustainability.

In 2009, Anette Kolmos joined the European Society for Engineering Education, SEFI, as president of the organisation. Here, she became the first, and so far only, female president of the large organisation.

Additionally, Kolmos has also been working as a visiting professor at the KTH Royal Institute of Technology in Stockholm and UTM University Technology Malaysia.

In 2013, Anette Kolmos was honored with the IFEES Global Award for Excellence in Engineering Education. She received the award for her efforts in her development and research within the field of engineering education.

In 2015, she also received the SEFI Fellowship Award for "deserving service for engineering education in Europe". In 2023, SEFI further awarded Anette Kolmos withe the Leonardo da Vinci medal.

Anette Kolmos has been a continuously active researcher and has published more than 250 research articles. Furthermore, she is an editor at the European Journal of Engineering Education.

== Selected works ==
- Kristina Edström, Anette Kolmos, Lauri Malmi, Jonte Bernhard, Pernille Andersson A (2018). Bottom-up strategy for establishment of EER in three Nordic countries – the role of networks, European Journal of Engineering Education. doi:10.1080/03043797.2016.1190956
- Kolmos, Anette; Holgaard and, Jette Egelund. Impact of PBL and company interaction on the transition from engineering education to work. /. In PBL, Social Progress and Sustainability. Aalborg Universitets Forlag, 2017. pp. 87 – 98.
- Kolmos, Anette.PBL CURRICULUM STRATEGIES : From Course Based PBL to a Systemic PBL Approach. In Aida Guerra; Ronald Ulseth; Anette Kolmos, eds. PBL in Engineering Education: International Perspectives on Curriculum Change. Sense Publishers, 2017. pp. 1–12.
- Kolmos, Anette. PBL in the School System. / in Pre-university Engineering Education. Sense Publishers, 2016. pp. 141–153.
