= Cathrine Hasse =

Danish anthropologist

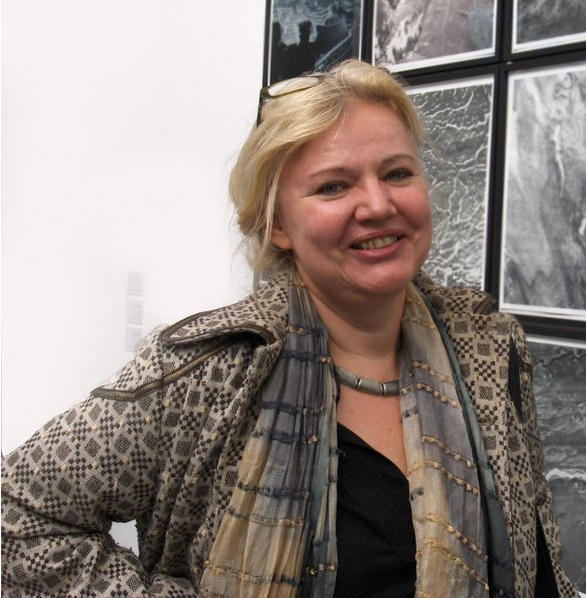
Cathrine Hasse

Cathrine Hasse (born 1956 in Denmark) is a professor of cultural anthropology and learning at the University of Aarhus, Denmark. Her research lies in the intersection between culture, learning and technology.

== Education ==
In 1994, Hasse graduated from anthropology from the University of Copenhagen, Denmark. Here, she was appointed a Ph.D.-scholarship in 1996.

== Career ==
From 2000 to 2001, she was affiliated with the National Research Center for the Humanities (Danmarks Humanistiske Forskningscenter) in Copenhagen. In 2002, she became an associate professor at the Department of Education, University of Aarhus, and in 2009 she became a professor MSO (“professor with special responsibilities”) at the Institute of Education and Pedagogy, also at the University of Aarhus, where Hasse since 2013 has led the research program Future Technologies, Culture and Learning located in Copenhagen.

Cathrine Hasse has also been affiliated with several universities as a research professor, incl. the University of Oxford, 2013, and at the Danish Institute for Science and Art in Rome, Italy, with regards to her interdisciplinary research of cultural dimensions in the natural sciences. Cathrine Hasse has led several international interdisciplinary research projects, incl. the EU-project Understanding Puzzles in the Gendered European Map (2005-2008), the Danish-Italian project The Cultural Dimensions of Science (2002-2005) and most recently the interdisciplinary technology project Technucation about technological literacy (2011-2015).

Furthermore, Hasse has written columns for the Danish daily newspaper Dagbladet Information and has also been a board member at the Department of Education, University of Aarhus (2000-2001), the Society of Gender Research (2000-2002) and of the Danish non-profit organization Oxfam IBIS (1990-1992). Since 2009, Hasse has been a member of the board of examiners for anthropology studies at the University of Copenhagen and, since 2012, a member of the board of examiners for techno-anthropology studies at Aalborg University. Since 2009, Cathrine Hasse has been a member of the research board at the Danish Confederation of Professional Associations (Academics) as well as of the research board at the Metropolitan University College, Denmark.

== Selected publications ==
- Søndergaard, K. D., & Hasse, C. (Eds.) (2012). Teknologiforståelse: på skoler og hospitaler. (1 ed.) Aarhus: Aarhus Universitetsforlag
- Høyrup, S., Bonnafous-Boucher, M., Hasse, C., Lotz, M., & Møller, K. V. (2012). Employee-Driven Innovation: A New Approach]. London: Palgrave Macmillan
- Hasse, C. (2011). Kulturanalyser i organisationer. Begreber, metoder og forbløffende læreprocesser København: Forlaget Samfundslitteratur.
- Hasse, C. (2008). Kulturpsykologi - Kulturens rolle, København: Forlaget Frydenlund.
- Hasse, C. (2002). Kultur i bevægelse: Fra deltagerobservation til kulturanalyse - i det fysiske rum, København: Forlaget Samfundslitteratur.
