= European Consortium of Innovative Universities =

The European Consortium of Innovative Universities (ECIU), founded in 1997, is a network of 14 universities.

== Mission ==
According to the ECIU's website, their mission is:

- To contribute to the development of a knowledge-based European economy, with the inclusion of ECIU overseas members (Associate Partners).
- To build on existing innovation and to enhance quality in the member institutions, in the areas of international collaboration; teaching and learning; regional development; technology transfer; and staff and student development.
- To develop collaborative educational programmes, by building on research and teaching strengths within the member institutions.
- To act as an ‘agent of change’ by serving as an example of best practice and by influencing debate and policy on the future direction of European higher education.

== Member universities ==
As of 2022 The ECIU has 14 members including one overseas associate partner:

- University of Aalborg, Denmark
- Dublin City University, Ireland
- Technische Universität Hamburg, Germany
- Kaunas University of Technology, Lithuania
- Linköping University, Sweden
- Tampere University, Finland
- Autonomous University of Barcelona, Spain
- Aveiro University, Portugal
- University of Stavanger, Norway
- University of Trento, Italy
- University of Twente, The Netherlands
- Institut national des sciences appliquées, France
- Łódź University of Technology, Poland

Associate partner universities

- Monterrey Institute of Technology and Higher Education, Mexico

== Organization and activities ==
The ECIU Executive Board, consisting of the rector or vice rector and a local coordinator of each member institution, meets twice a year. The local coordinator is the contact person for information on activities, projects, and seminars. He informs the partner university about ECIU activities.

The activities of the consortium are organized within four core areas:

- Improved student mobility and the ECIU Graduate School
- Human Resources Development
- Knowledge Triangle
- EU Policy

In addition to the Steering Committees, there are working groups for staff members of the member institutions.
