= Peter Hervik =

Danish anthropologist and professor (born 1956)

Peter Hervik is a Danish independent scholar and former professor of Anthropology at Aalborg University. He received his Ph.D. in anthropology at the University of Copenhagen and a Swedish Docent degree in International Migration and Ethnic Relations (IMER) at Malmö University. He completed his Ph.D. thesis based on ethnographic fieldwork in Yucatán, Mexico where he studied the incongruency between external representation of "Maya culture" and the self-categorization of people associated with Maya culture. He also held academic positions at the University of Oslo, Malmö University, and Hitotsubashi University. His research interests include neonationalism, racism, global populism, extremism, anthropology of the far right, ethnicity and identity, consciousness, migration, political communication and extreme speech

A key contribution is the The Annoying Difference; The Emergence of Danish Neo-nationalism, Neo-racism, and Populism the post 1989 World (2011), which develops a historical and analytic framework for Danish neonationalism, neoracism, and populism by tying three pivotal media events in Denmark. These events were covered in earlier research projections and publications during their historical emergence. First is the 1997 newspaper campaign and birth of the nationalist party, Danish Peoples’ party. Secondly, the early 2001 story of three young Muslim Danish politicians in Danish politics, and thirdly the 2005–06 Muhammad cartoon crisis. The book maps transnational networks, political entrepreneurs, and media dynamics that shaped public perceptions of minorities and constitute the historical emergence of Danish neonationalism, neoracism and populism. Later, he published on a book on racialization in Denmark and one on racism in the Nordic countries.

More recently, Digital Hate: The Global Conjuncture of Extreme Speech co‑edited with Sahana Udupa and Iginio Gagliardone, provides the first distinctly global and interdisciplinary perspective on hateful language online. Moving beyond Euro-American allegations of "fake news," contributors draw attention to local idioms and practices and explore the profound implications for how community is imagined, enacted, and brutally enforced around the world and set within a decolonial optic.The analysis of extreme speech shows how digital hate cultures reshape belonging, exclusion, and political enforcement, revealing the internet’s shift from democratic promise to polarized, hostile practice.

The Handbook of Anthropology and Artificial Intelligence (published in 2026, co-edited with Sahana Udupa), offers a groundbreaking ethnographic framework for understanding AI as a sociocultural phenomenon. The volume examines human–machine entanglements across global contexts—from healthcare and policing to warfare and climate politics—critiquing AI’s limits, promises, and power through anthropological theory and field‑based research.

Selected works

- Hervik, Peter (with Sahana Udupa) (eds.). 2026. Handbook on anthropology and artificial intelligence. Cheltenham, UK; Northampton, MA: Edward Elgar Publishing. https://doi.org/10.4337/9781035342204
- Hervik, Peter (2021). Sådan er det bare! Antropologiske perspektiver på oplevelser og reaktioner på racialisering i Danmark. Aarhus: Klims Forlag. ISBN 978-87-7204-754-6
- Peter Hervik (co-editor) (2021). Digital Hate. Global Perspectives on Online Extreme Culture. India-na University Press. ISBN 9780253059253
- Hervik, Peter (ed.) (2019). Racialization, Racism and anti-Racism in the Nordic Countries. Series: Approaches to Social Inequality and Difference. Palgrave Macmillan. ISBN 978-3-319-74629-6.
- Hervik, Peter (2012). The Danish Muhammad Cartoon Conflict. Current Themes in IMER Research 13, Malmö Institute for Studies of Migration, Diversity and Welfare (MIM), Malmö University. https://muep.mau.se/handle/2043/14094 ISBN 978-91-7104-438-9
- Hervik, Peter (2011). The Annoying Difference. The Emergence of Danish Neonationalism, Neoracism, and Populism in the Post-1989 World. Berghahn Books. ISBN 978-0-85745-100-2
- Hervik, Peter (2003). Mayan People Within and Beyond Boundaries. Social Categories and Lived Identity in Yucatan. Routledge ISBN 0-415-94526-7 (pb)
- Hervik, Peter (2002). Mediernes muslimer. En antropologisk undersøgelse af mediernes dækning af religioner i Danmark. The Board for Ethnic Equality: Copenhagen. ISBN 87-91004-41-1
- Hervik, Peter (editor) (1999). Den generende forskellighed. Danske svar på den stigende multikultu-ralisme. Hans Reitzels Forlag. ISBN 87-412-2716-6
- Peter Hervik (co-editor). 1994. Social Experience and Anthropological Knowledge. Routledge. ISBN 0-415-10657-5
