= Finn Kjærsdam =

Danish academic

- Born: 25 November 1943; Roskilde, Denmark
- Education: Royal Veterinary and Agricultural University
- Scientific career
- Fields: Land Surveying
- Workplaces: Royal Veterinary and Agricultural University; Aalborg University

Finn Kjærsdam (born 25 November 1943) is a Danish Land Surveyor and former rector and professor of Urban Planning at Aalborg University (AAU).

Finn Kjærsdam is born in Roskilde in 1943, but grew up most of his childhood in Køge. He graduated from Roskilde Cathedral School as a mathematical and natural science high school student in 1963. He subsequently studied at the Royal Veterinary and Agricultural University (which is now part of the University of Copenhagen) and became a Land Surveyor in 1969.

Five years later in 1974 he received a Ph.D. in Urban Planning also from the Royal Veterinary and Agricultural University. Finn Kjærsdam began his career in the academic world as an Assistant Professor and later an associate professor at the Royal Veterinary and Agricultural University. In 1975 he became associate professor of urban planning at the newly established Aalborg University.

Later he headed the Department of Social Development and Planning at Aalborg University. Finn Kjærsdam has also been a senior research fellow and completed a research program at the Nordic Institute for Urban Planning (NORDPLAN) in Stockholm. He defended a doctoral thesis which dealt with the relationship between science and applied science at NORDPLAN/AAU and he was then awarded the title of Doctor of Technology.

In 1988 he was appointed as a professor at Aalborg University. Later he also became a Dean of the Faculty of Engineering and Science at Aalborg University, a title which he held for 17 years. In 2006 he took over the title as rector at Aalborg University from his predecessor Jørgen Østergaard and held the title until 2014, when he was replaced by his successor Per Michael Johansen. Finn Kjærsdam is knight and commander of the order of Dannebrog.

== Sources ==
- Aalborg University: Board of Directors Accessed 2007-02-14
- Aalborg Universitet: Nyheder om uddannelse (Danish) Accessed 2014-05-08
- Finn Kjærsdam (Danish) Accessed Accessed 2019-06-24
- Energi, anarki og en sjat frækhed (Danish) Accessed 2019-06-24
- Banjoglad rektor fylder rundt (Danish) Accessed 2019-06-24
