= Per Michael Johansen =

Danish engineer and physicist

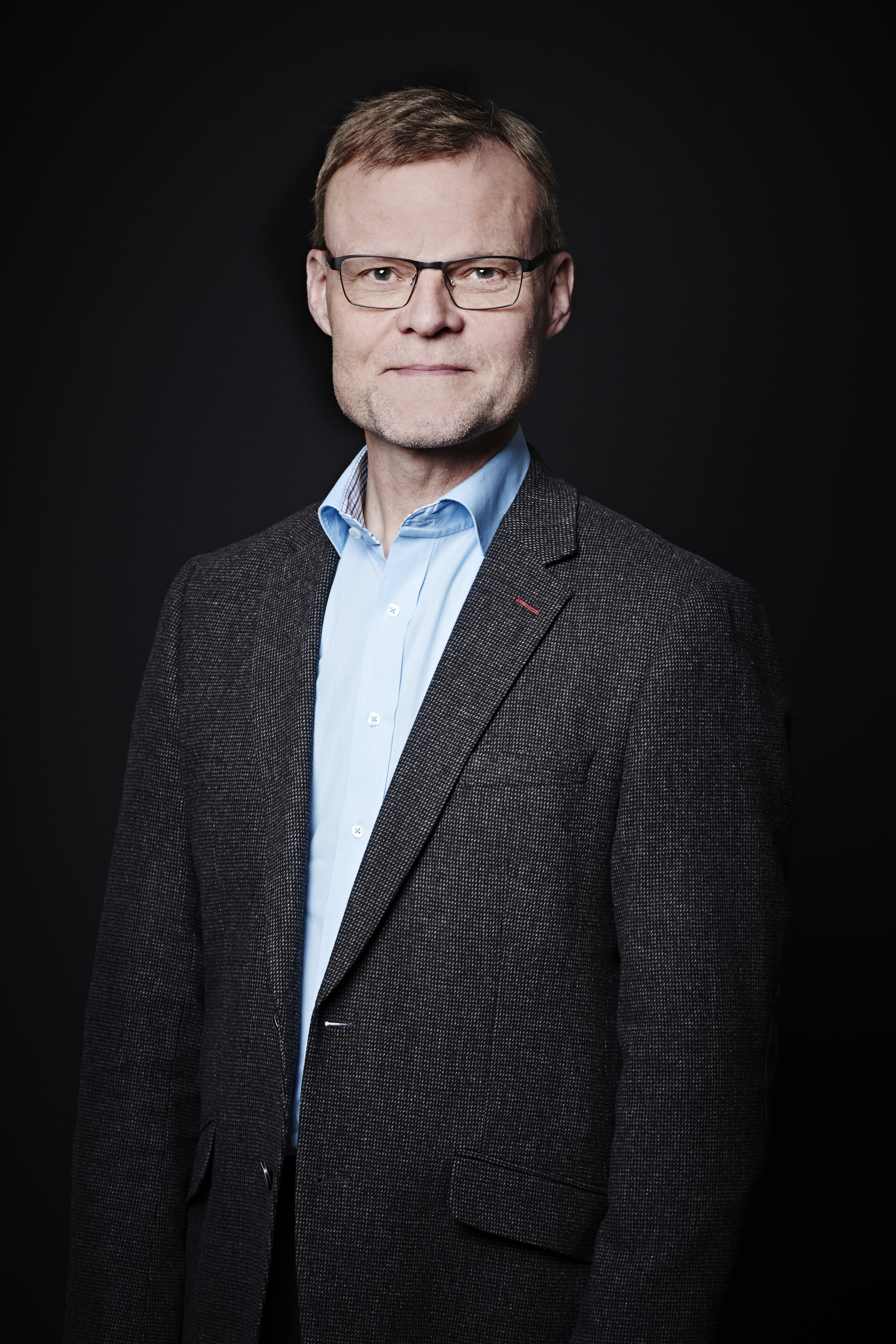
- Born: 15 August 1960; Agger, Denmark
- Education: Technical University of Denmark; Aalborg University; University of Copenhagen
- Scientific career
- Fields: Engineering and Physics
- Workplaces: Aalborg University; Technical University of Denmark; University of Southern Denmark

Per Michael Johansen (born 1960) is a Danish engineer and physicist and the current rector of Aalborg University (AAU).

== Early life ==
Johansen was born in 1960 in the small holiday and fishing village Agger in the Thy district, which is located in the northwestern part of Jutland in Denmark. He graduated from high school in Thisted in 1980. He subsequently studied Technical Physics (Engineering) at Aalborg University and holds a master's degree within this particular field which he was awarded in 1986. In addition to his master's degree he also holds a PhD (awarded in 1989) and a title of Doctor of Science in physics (awarded in 2001).

== Academic career ==
After graduating his PhD, Johansen first worked at Aalborg University (AAU) for a short period at the Department of Physics. Later, he was employed as a researcher at Risø DTU National Laboratory for Sustainable Energy for a number of years. In 2005, he became Director of Svendborg International Maritime Academy. After his job as director, he became the Dean of the Faculty of Engineering at the University of Southern Denmark for seven years. In 2014, he took over the title and job as rector at Aalborg University (AAU) from his predecessor Finn Kjærsdam.
