= Christian Graugaard =

Danish medical doctor and sexologist

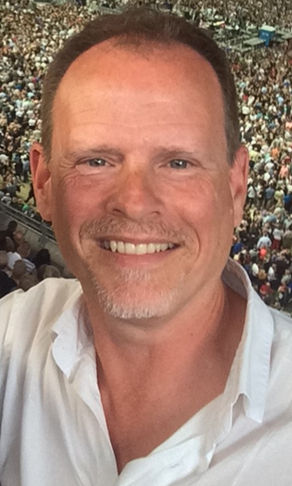
Christian Graugaard

Christian Lykke Graugaard (born 1967) is a Danish medical doctor, author, poet, and professor of sexology at Aalborg University. He has published widely about sexology, both in popular and scientific contexts, and has published a number of collections of his own poetry as well as translations of works by Nordic poets. He has also been a regular contributor to the debate section in the newspaper Politiken. Furthermore, in his role as director of the organization Sex & Samfund (Sex & Society), he is a frequent commentator on issues related to human sexuality in the Danish public debate. He is a critic of the practice of circumcision of boys, arguing that it should only be a legal procedure for boys above the age of 15, the Danish age of sexual consent.

== Publications ==
- Kan jeg købe dine øjnes blå dans (digte) 1986
- Falske rum (digte) 1987
- Febertræer (digte) 1988
- Hjerne og seksualitet – aspekter af teori og klinik 1997
- Ung og sårbar 2000
- Sexleksikon – fra abe til Aarestrup 2001
- Lir – slang om sex 2002
- Krop, sygdom & seksualitet 2006
- Kend din krop, mand 2006
- Corpus – rejser i menneskekroppen 2008
- Kun for drenge – værd at vide om krop, følelser og sex 2010

Translations:

- Werner Aspenström: Sardinen i tunnelbanen – digte 1946-97 2004
- Rolf Jacobsen: Fluen i teleskopet – digte 1933-85 2007
- Elmer Diktonius: På toppen af et øjeblik – digte 1921-54 2011
