= Sven Caspersen =

Danish economist

- Born: 1935 (age 90–91)
- Education: University of Copenhagen
- Scientific career
- Fields: Economies
- Workplaces: Aalborg University

Sven Caspersen (born 1935) is a Danish economist and former rector at Aalborg University.

Sven Caspersen holds a MSc degree in economy from the University of Copenhagen but moved to Aalborg in 1973. Here he joined the newly established university center as it was known back then which had officially opened in 1974. In 1976 Sven Caspersen was appointed as rector of Aalborg University Center (later Aalborg University) and succeeded the very first rector of the university the Swedish historian Jörgen Weibull. Sven Caspersen was rector at Aalborg University from 1976 to 2004 where he was succeeded by Jørgen Østergaard. Sven Caspersen also held the post as chairman of the university board from 2004 to 2006.
