= Anette Borchorst =

Danish academic (born 1951)

- Born: March 9, 1951 (age 75); Copenhagen

Academic background
- Education: Aarhus University (Masters) Aalborg University (Ph.D.)

Academic work
- Discipline: Social Science

Anette Borchorst is a Danish professor of both Political Gender Research at CCWS Center for Comparative Welfare Studies and the Center for Labor Market Research (CARMA), the Department of Political Science at Aalborg University. Also, she is Head of the Department of Political Science at Aalborg University.

== Education ==
Borchorst graduated in social science from Aarhus University in 1979. In 1984 she obtained a Ph.D. from the Faculty of Social Sciences at Aalborg University.

== Career ==
Since 2008, Borchorst has been a professor at the Aalborg University and has been head of the Department of Political science at Aalborg University since 2016. Borchorst specializes in gender, power and politics in Denmark and the Nordic countries, as well as equality and welfare policy in Denmark and the Nordic countries. Borchorst has been the research leader on several research projects. This includes, for the Women's Constitution, Gender, Democracy, and Welfare project 1915–2015. Also, for the 2014 GRIP research program, which was funded by the VELUX Foundation. Borchorst has also been a member of the Prime Minister's Equality Council from 1988 to 1994 and chaired the Equality Council in Research at the Ministry of Research from 1997 to 1998.
