= Roberta Rabellotti =

Italian professor

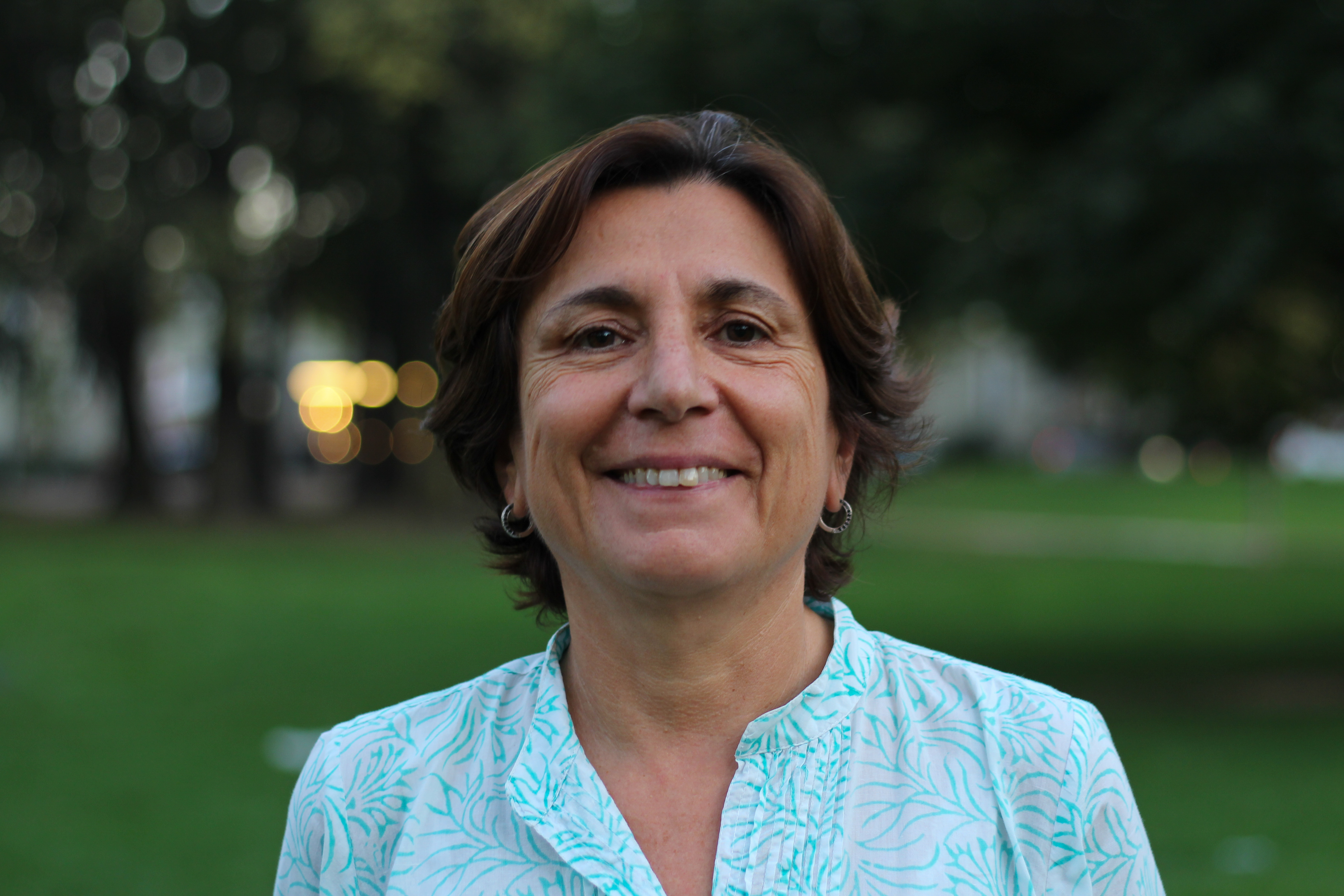
- Education: MSc from University of Oxford & PhD from Sussex University
- Occupation: Professor at Aalborg University
- Employer: Aalborg University

Roberta Rabellotti is an Italian professor of economics at the Department of Business and Management at Aalborg University. Furthermore, Rabellotti is employed as a professor of economics at the University of Pavia.

== Education ==
In 1988, Roberta Rabellotti obtained her Master's degree (Ms.c.) in development economics from the University of Oxford. In 1995, she received a PhD from the Institute of Development Studies at the University of Sussex.

== Career ==
Roberta Rabellotti is specialised in innovation economics, development economics, and regional economics. She has been particularly occupied with, and contributed to, research within development economics, regional economics, innovation in developing countries, clusters and small enterprises, multinationals and Global Value Chains.

As part of her working career, she has been part of UNCTAD, Orkestra, Inter-American Development Bank, ILO, EC, ECLAC, and UNIDO. Additionally, Rabellotti has functioned as a board member at different organisations. These include positions as:

- Member of the scientific board Società Italiana degli Economisti.
- Member of the International Advisory Board of CIRCLE, Lund University.
