= Aalborg University =

Public university in Denmark

Aalborg University (AAU)
- Aalborg Universitet (AAU)
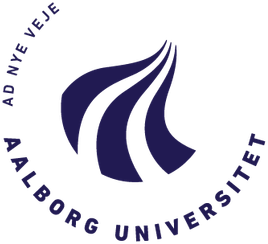
- Motto: Ad nye veje (Danish); Viis Novis (Latin)
- Motto in English: On New Paths (from Danish), New Ways (from Latin)
- Type: Public university
- Established: 1974; 52 years ago
- Affiliations: ECIU, ENTREE and CESAER
- Budget: DKK 3,092,985,000 (2021)
- Chairman: André Rogaczewski
- Rector: Per Michael Johansen
- Academic staff: 2,346 FTE (2021)
- Administrative staff: 1,303 FTE (2021)
- Students: 19,410 (2021)
- Doctoral students: 820 (2021)
- Location: Aalborg, North Jutland Region, Denmark; 57°00′54″N 9°59′06″E
- Campus: Aalborg, Esbjerg, Copenhagen
- Colours: AAU Blue and white
- Website: en.aau.dk

Aalborg University (AAU) is an international public university with campuses in Aalborg, Esbjerg, and Copenhagen, Denmark. Founded in 1974, the university awards bachelor's degrees, master's degrees, and PhD degrees in a wide variety of subjects within humanities, social sciences, information technology, design, engineering, exact sciences, and medicine.

== History ==
The movement for a university in the North Jutland Region started in 1961 when the North Jutland Committee for higher education institutions was established. On 19 August 1969 the Aalborg University Association was founded and a planning group was established with Eigil Hastrup as chairman. The same year in December, about 1,000 people from North Jutland demonstrated in front of the Folketinget (the Danish Parliament) for their cause.

In 1970, the law for the establishment of a university centre in Aalborg was passed in the Danish Parliament. In 1972, it was decided that the first rector of the new university center should be the Swedish historian and professor Jörgen Weibull. On 1 September 1974, Aalborg University Center (AUC) was inaugurated by Queen Margrethe II of Denmark. Jørgen Weibull was replaced by Sven Caspersen as rector of Aalborg University Center (AUC) in 1976. At the same time, a new management organization was established under a consistory. The first formal cooperation agreement was signed with the University of Wisconsin–Green Bay in 1980. The North Jutland knowledge park was established in 1989 as a neighbor to Aalborg University Center (AUC).

In 1993, external representatives joined the consistory. In 1994, Aalborg University Center (AUC) changed its name to Aalborg University (AAU). Aalborg University - Esbjerg was established through a merger between the engineering college in Esbjerg and Aalborg University in 1995. In 1998, the NOVI science park was connected to Aalborg University. Aalborg University Copenhagen was formed in collaboration with the engineering college in Copenhagen in 2003. A new university board was formed and joined by its members on 1 February 2004, with Jørgen Østergaard appointed as rector. In 2005, Finn Kjærsdam was hired by the university board as rector. Aalborg University and the Danish Building Research Institute merged in 2007. In 2010, Aalborg University established a faculty of Medicine and created a medical education. Per Michael Johansen was hired as rector by the university board in 2014.

== List of rectors ==
Since Aalborg University's foundation in 1974, the university has had a total of five rectors in office.

Period	Name	Research area
1974–1976	Jörgen Weibull	History
1976–2004	Sven Caspersen	Economics
2004–2005	Jørgen Østergaard	Engineering
2005–2014	Finn Kjærsdam	Land surveying and urban planning
2014–present	Per Michael Johansen	Engineering and Physics

== Profile ==
Aalborg University differentiates itself from the older and more traditional Danish universities with its focus on interdisciplinary, inter-faculty studies; an experimental curriculum based on an interdisciplinary basic course with subsequent specialisation; a pedagogical structure based on problem-centred, real-life projects of educational and research relevance – which internationally has become known and recognised as The Aalborg Model. With the problem-based, project-organised model, semesters at AAU are centred around complex real-life problems which students attempt to find answers to in a scientific manner while working together in groups. In February 2007, the foundation of the UICEE Centre for Problem Based Learning (UCPBL) paid recognition to Aalborg University, which subsequently led to the appointment of AAU as UNESCO Chair in problem-based learning.

== University rankings ==
Rankings
Global rankings
- ARWU (2026): 401−500
- QS (2027): 306
- THE (2026): 251−300

According to U.S. News & World Report's 2021 ranking, Aalborg University (AAU) was ranked the eighth best university in the world and the best in Europe within mechanical engineering.

In a Massachusetts Institute of Technology (MIT) study which analyzed the global state of art in the engineering education, Aalborg University (AAU) was named as the leading university in Europe in engineering education by 50 thought leaders from all over the world.

In 2021, Times Higher Education Impact Rankings ranked Aalborg University number 6 in the world, out of 1,117 universities from 94 countries/regions, according to the United Nations' Sustainable Development Goals. That is the number 1 university in the European Union (EU). In 2022, Times Higher Education Impact Rankings ranked Aalborg University (AAU) as the best university in the world in Sustainable Development Goal 4 (Quality Education) for the third year in a row.

For the academic year 2023, in overall terms, Aalborg University (AAU) has significantly dropped in worldwide university rankings, according to THE and QS. In addition, the Danish university dropped even more drastically in worldwide academic rankings during 2022 according to ARWU. In the 2024 QS top, Aalborg University (AAU) dropped to the 336th position.

== Administration and organisation ==
The university is governed by a board consisting of 11 members as follows:

- Six members recruited outside the university form the majority of the board;
- Two members are appointed by the scientific staff;
- One member is appointed by the administrative staff;
- Two members are appointed by the university students.

The rector is appointed by the university board. The rector in turn appoints deans, and deans appoint heads of departments. There is no faculty senate and faculty are not involved in the appointment of rector, deans, or department heads. Hence the university has no faculty governance.

== Campuses ==
Aalborg University (AAU) has campuses in Aalborg, Esbjerg, and Copenhagen.

=== Esbjerg ===
Aalborg University Esbjerg (AAU-Esbjerg) is an organisational unit (department) under Aalborg University, but is geographically located in Esbjerg. The institute's official name is "Esbjerg Technical Institute", formerly the "Department of Chemistry and Applied Engineering."

AAUE has approximately 500 students and educates mainly engineers, but also offers a number of niche programmes such as fishing technology and a graduate degree in computer science education (Bachelor of Science in software engineering).

Aalborg University Esbjerg was created through a merger of Engineering College Esbjerg and Aalborg University in 1995. Since the merger, the number of applicants for Aalborg University Esbjerg has risen steadily and therefore there have been a need for extensions of the physical environment in several stages.

The university offers programmes in information technology, with a Department of Software and Media Technology.

The student organisation at AAU-Esbjerg is called DSR-SE and the student bar is called "The Loophole" (Danish: Smuthullet).

== Faculties and departments ==
Aalborg University has five faculties with a number of departments:

- Faculty of Humanities
  - Department of Communication and Psychology
  - Department of Culture and Learning
- Faculty of Social Sciences
  - AAU Business School
  - Department of Law
  - Department of Politics and Society
  - Department of Sociology and Social Work
- Technical Faculty of IT and Design
  - Department of Electronic Systems
  - Department of Computer Science
  - Department of Architecture, Design, and Media Technology
  - Department of Planning
- Faculty of Engineering and Science
  - Department of the Built Environment
  - Department of Materials and Production
  - Department of Chemistry and Bioscience
  - Department of Mathematical Sciences
  - Department of Energy
- Faculty of Medicine
  - Department of Health Science and Technology
  - Department of Clinical Medicine

== Library and Press ==
Aalborg University Library is a public research library for the North Jutland region. The library's primary mission is to support research and education at Aalborg University by providing appropriate information and documentation. The main branch of the University Library is located at Kroghstræde 3 in Aalborg, which is linked to smaller branches located on other campuses in Aalborg, Esbjerg, and Copenhagen.

Aalborg University through Aalborg University Press is a publisher of wide range of journals, and among them four journals are listed in Scopus: International Journal of Sustainable Energy Planning and Management, Journal of Somaesthetics, Journal of China and International Relations and Academic quarter (Journal for humanistic research). Other journals are, for example, Journal of Business Models, Coaching Psychology - The Danish Journal of Coaching Psychology, Journal of Problem Based Learning in Higher Education, Globe: A Journal of Language, Culture and Communication, Music Therapy in Psychiatry Online.

Aalborg University Press was founded in 1978 and it focuses on political science, sociology, media and cultural studies. However, according to Scopus, the journal with highest score and number of citations is International Journal of Sustainable Energy Planning and Management, with focus on Energy System analysis, Economics, Socio economics and Feasibility studies as well as specific feasibility studies and analyses of the transition to sustainable energy systems. All journals are Open access and most of the journal content is peer-reviewed. Majority of authors are affiliated with Aalborg University (AU), but few of the authors are international scholars, since AU is an international orientated University.

== Research ==
AAU conducts research within all faculties. Aalborg University is among the leading universities in the world within health technology research, wireless communication, energy, computer science, innovation economics, and comparative welfare studies. AAU has established centres for telecommunications at the Birla Institute of Technology in India, the Bandung Institute of Technology in Indonesia, and the University of Rome Tor Vergata in Italy. Furthermore, AAU has established a research centre for health technology at Xi'an Jiaotong University in China.

AAU has conducted several experiments in the field of CubeSat technology. The first AAU CubeSat was launched on 30 June 2003, the second (called AAUSAT-II) on 28 April 2008 and the third will be launched in Q1, 2013. After launching AAUSAT3 the fourth will begin development.

AAU has always adopted a cross-disciplinary, problem-based approach to research which often requires contributions from a number of scientific disciplines. Aalborg University has five cross-disciplinary action areas:

- Sustainable energy, the environment and construction;
- Global production, innovation, knowledge development and coherence;
- Information technology;
- Nanotechnology and nanoproduction;
- Experience technology and design.

== Cooperative agreements ==
Aalborg University is a member of the European Consortium of Innovative Universities (ECIU), which was founded in 1997 and is currently composed by 14 universities. The other universities are: Dublin City University, Ireland; Linköping University, Sweden; University of Aveiro, Portugal; Autonomous University of Barcelona, Spain; Hamburg University of Technology, Germany; University of Stavanger, Norway; Kaunas University of Technology, Lithuania; Tampere University of Technology, Finland; University of Twente, The Netherlands; University of Trento, Italy; Łódź University of Technology, Poland and Monterrey Institute of Technology and Higher Education, Mexico.

The aim of the ECIU is to create a European network where participating universities can exchange experiences and practices in projects in education, research, and regional development. In 2010, the ECIU consisted of eleven members and three foreign affiliates.

Aalborg university is an active member of the University of the Arctic. UArctic is an international cooperative network based in the Circumpolar Arctic region, consisting of more than 200 universities, colleges, and other organizations with an interest in promoting education and research in the Arctic region.

The university participates in UArctic's mobility program north2north. The aim of that program is to enable students of member institutions to study in different parts of the North.

== Gallery ==
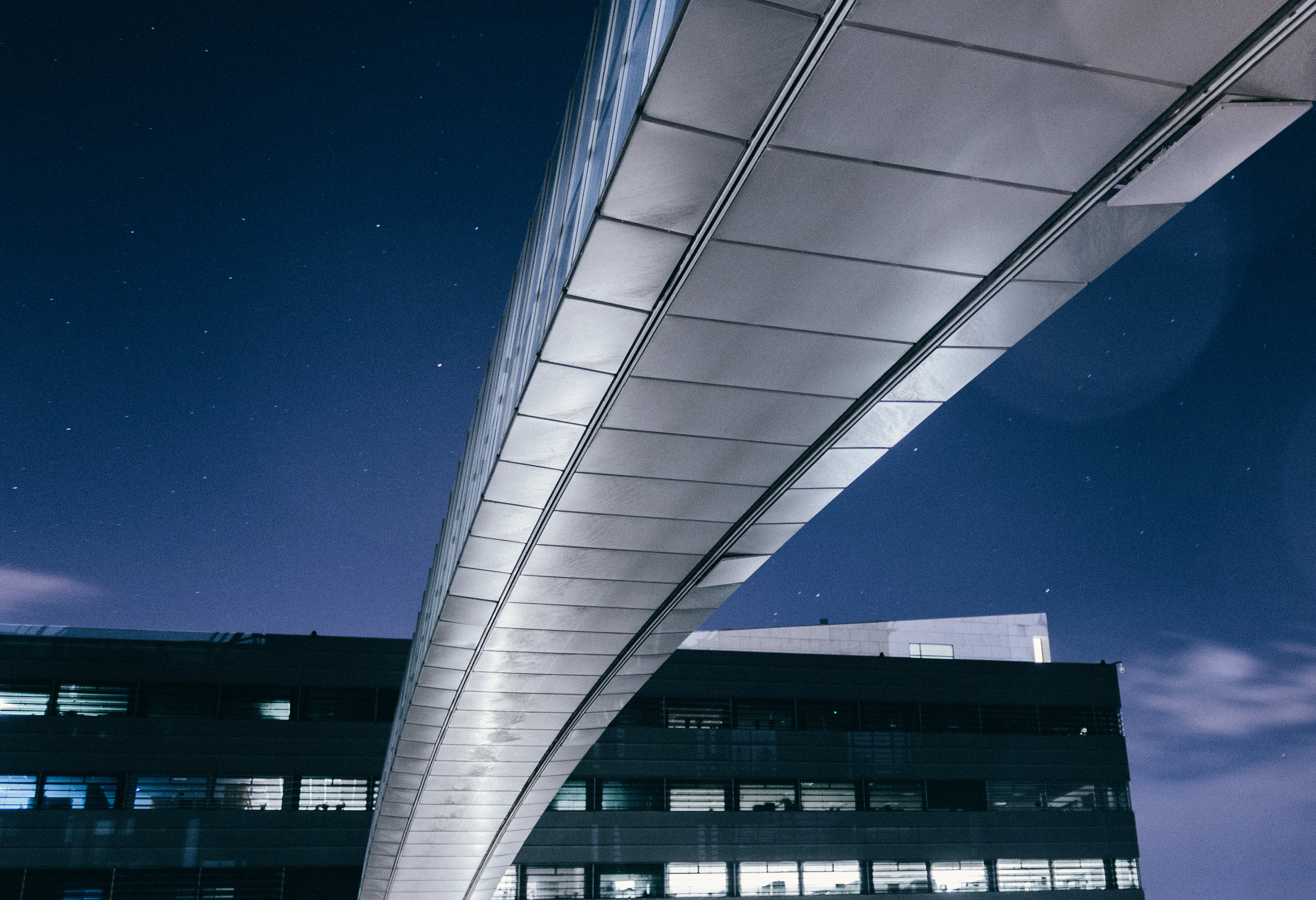
Skyway at Aalborg University in Copenhagen seen from Frederikskaj

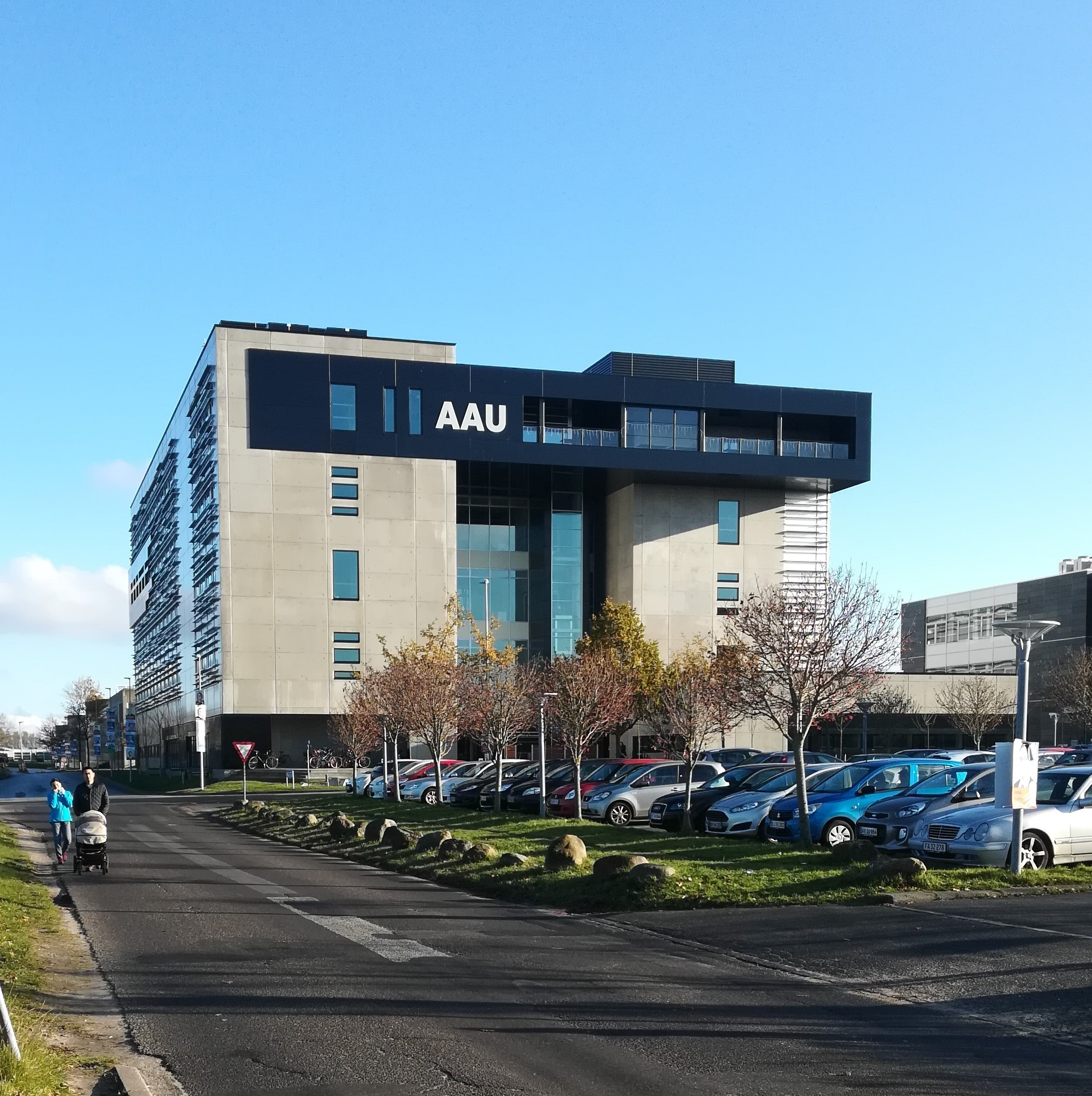
Fredrik Bajers Vej 7H (Aalborg Universitet)

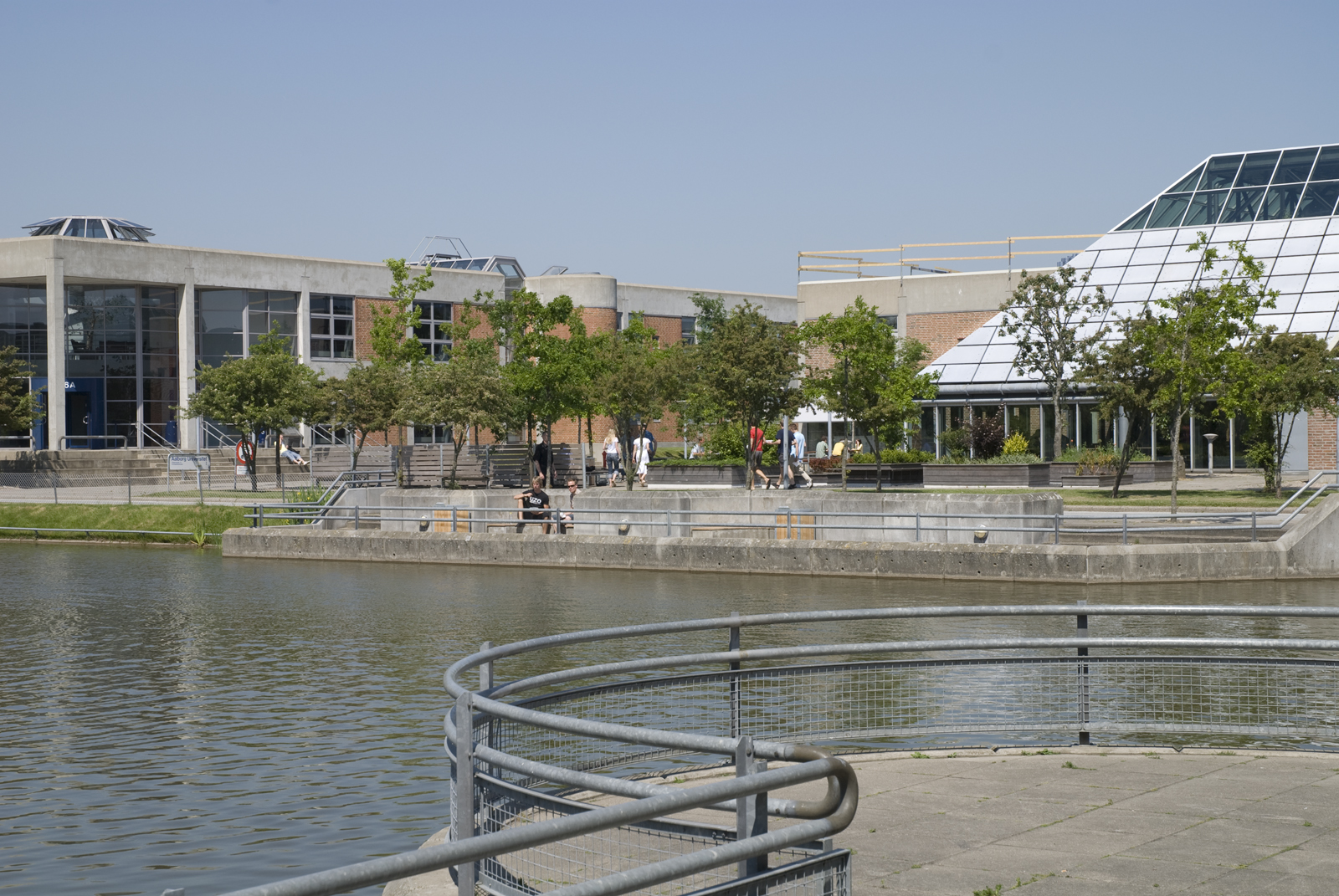
Aalborg University in Aalborg, Campus East

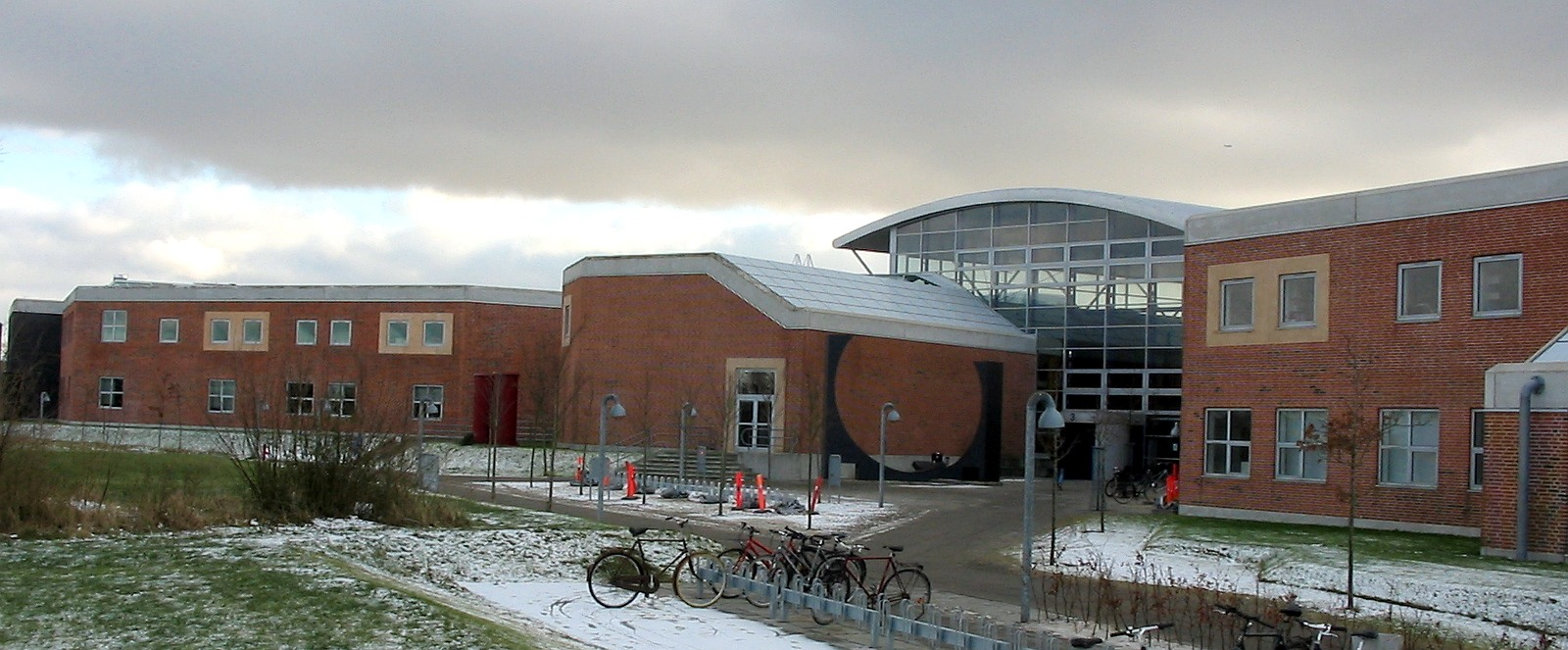
Aalborg University in Aalborg, Campus East

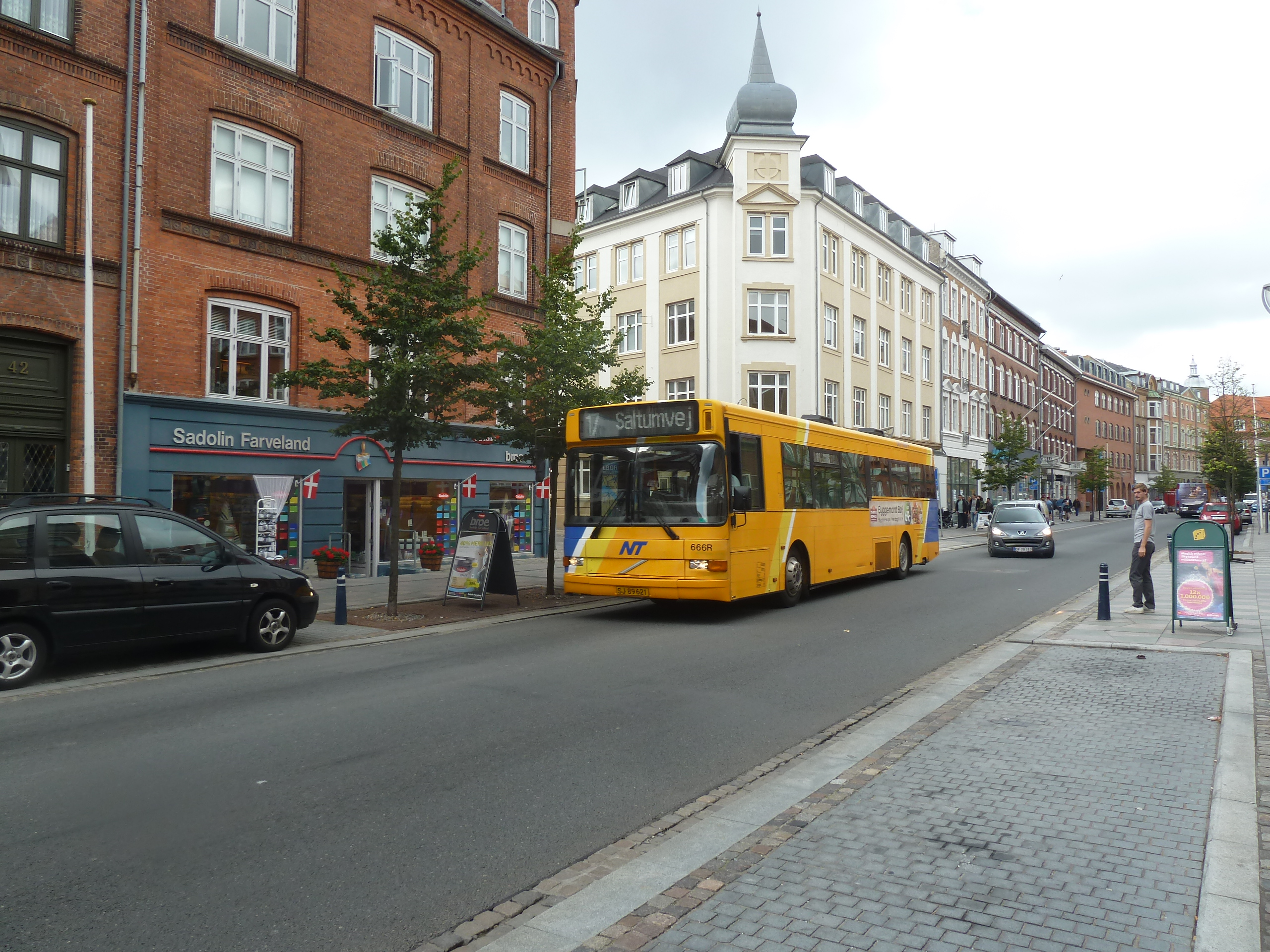
Boulevarden 38, in the town centre of Aalborg, where mainly MSc students are temporarily housed by the IAO (International Accommodation Office) of Aalborg University

== Notable people ==
- Frank Aaen, Danish economist, former member of the Danish Parliament and member of the Red–Green Alliance
- Gunhild Moltesen Agger, professor in Danish media history
- Erik Bach, Danish composer and music teacher
- Louis Becker, Danish architect and lecturer
- Jens Blauert, German scientist and emeritus professor
- Frede Blaabjerg, World known Danish researcher within the areas of renewable energy and power electronics
- Anette Borchorst, Danish Professor
- Vladimir Bouchler, Uzbek theatre director and pedagogue
- Ann-Dorte Christensen, Danish professor
- Henrik I. Christensen, Danish roboticist and Distinguished Professor
- Jesper deClaville Christiansen, Danish professor
- Klaus Dittrich, German computer scientist
- Jan Fagerberg, Norwegian professor
- Bent Flyvbjerg, Danish social scientist
- Mette Frederiksen, Danish politician, leader of the Social Democrats and Prime Minister of Denmark
- Christopher Freeman, British economist
- Christian Graugaard, Danish physician, professor, researcher, commentator, critic, poet and writer
- Lars Graugaard, Danish flutist, composer, music teacher and researcher
- Carsten Greve, Danish professor
- Birkir Hólm Guðnason, Icelandic business leader and CEO of Icelandair
- Dorte Hammershøi, Danish professor
- Thomas Blom Hansen, Danish anthropologist
- Fredric J. Harris, American professor
- Cathrine Hasse, Danish professor with special responsibilities
- Christian Geo Heltboe, Danish comedian
- Peter Hervik, Danish anthropologist and professor
- Arlie Russell Hochschild, American professor
- Lars Bo Ibsen, Professor at Aalborg University
- Anders Post Jacobsen, Danish professional football player
- Frank Jensen, Danish politician, former Lord Mayor of Copenhagen, a member of the Social Democrats and former minister
- Anja Jørgensen, Danish professor
- Per Michael Johansen, Danish rector
- Rosabeth Moss Kanter, American professor
- Finn Kjærsdam, Danish former rector at Aalborg University and professor
- Anette Kolmos, Danish professor
- Arnulf Kolstad, Norwegian social psychologist
- Kim Guldstrand Larsen, Danish scientist and professor
- Mads Mensah Larsen, Danish handball player
- Torben Larsen, Danish scientist
- Karsten Lauritzen, Branch Director of DI, former member of the Danish Parliament and member of Venstre. Served as minister of taxation under Lars Løkke Rasmussen II Cabinet
- Steffen Lauritzen, Danish professor
- Henrik Lund, Danish engineer and professor
- Bengt-Åke Lundvall Danish organizational theorist
- Brian Vad Mathiesen, Danish engineer and professor
- Morten Middelfart, Danish entrepreneur, inventor and technologist
- Søren Hald Møller, Danish official
- Henrik Frystyk Nielsen, Danish engineer and computer scientist
- Malene Freudendal-Pedersen, Danish professor
- Anne Phillips, British professor
- Vincent Poor, American dean and professor
- Zenon J. Pudlowski, Polish engineer and educator
- Roberta Rabellotti, professor of economics
- Herbert Pundik, Danish-Jewish journalist and author
- Toke Reichstein, Danish economist and professor
- Mike Sandbothe, German intellectual and philosopher
- Henrik Scharfe, Danish professor
- Lene Siel, Danish singer
- Hege Skjeie, Norwegian political scientist and feminist
- David Spiegelhalter, British statistician
- Jakob Stoustrup, Danish professor
- Emil Wolf, Czech born American physicist
- Jonas Kærlev, creator of A Hat in Time.
- Pascal Madeline, professor in sports science and ergonomics

== See also ==
- Centre for Comparative Welfare Studies
- Open access in Denmark
