= Lars Graugaard =

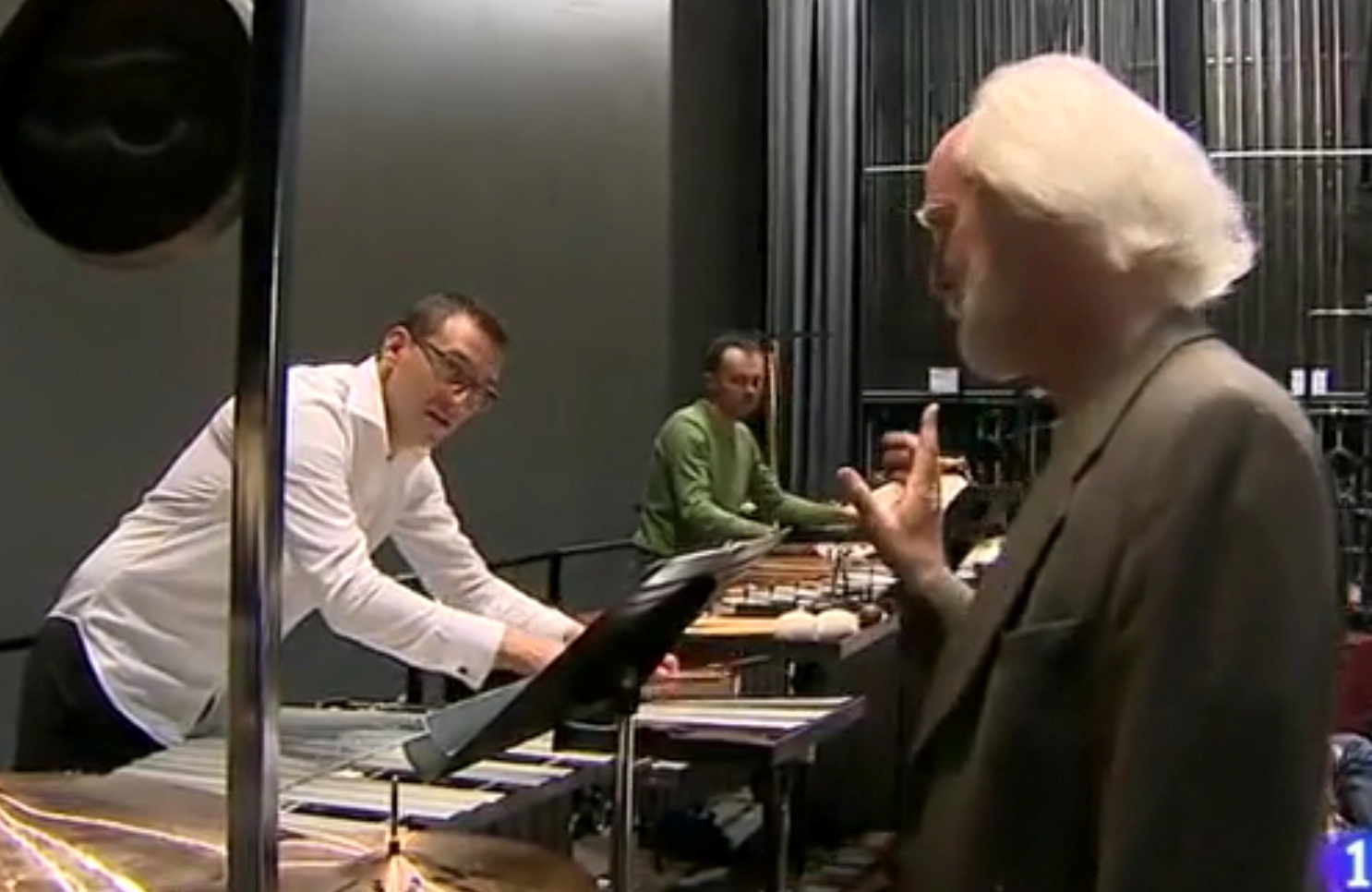
Grup Instrumental de València and Lars Graugaard ca. 2014

Lars Graugaard (born Copenhagen, 10 February 1957) is a Danish composer of contemporary classical music and a laptop performer of improvised music and experimental techno music.

== Education ==
Graugaard studied at The Royal Danish Academy of Music between 1977 and 1983. He studied composition with Niels Viggo Bentzon, flute performance with Poul Birkelund, and supplementary studies with Michel Debost. Graugaard graduated in 1983 with an MA in flute performance. In the early 1980s he briefly sought compositional advice from leading Danish composers before pursuing self-guided studies in composition and other forms of musical creation. He received a PhD from Oxford Brookes University in 2006 with his dissertation Gesture And Emotion In Interactive Music – Artistic and Technological Challenges, under the supervision of Robert Rowe and Paul Dibley.

== Career ==
Since the late 2000s he has used empirical studies from cognitive musicology into the correlation between emotion and score notation to guide musical discourse and development. This allows him to preserve his compositional materials and procedures, while at the same time attending the music's expressive dimension, as manifested in works such as "Three Places" (2011), "Venus" (2013) and "Engage And Share" (2014).

Implementing aspects of his compositional procedures in computer code has allowed him to use empirical models of pitch sequences.
