= SDEWES Centre =

- Company type: Non-governmental research organization
- Genre: Sustainable development
- Founded: Zagreb, Croatia (2009)
- Headquarters: Zagreb, Croatia
- Key people: Neven Duić (Chairman); Brian Vad Mathiesen; Natasha Markovska; Daniel Rolph Schneider; Goran Krajačić
- Website: www.sdewes.org

SDEWES Centre (The International Centre for Sustainable Development of Energy, Water and Environment Systems), is a non-governmental scientific organization based at the University of Zagreb, Croatia.

== Mission ==
SDEWES Centre is dedicated to the improvement and dissemination of knowledge on methods, policies and technologies for increasing the sustainability of development by de-coupling growth from natural resources and replacing them with knowledge-based economy, taking into account its economic, environmental and social pillars. One of the main issues of the coming decades is to improve efficiencies by integrating various life supporting systems, using waste from one, as resource in other, and in exact moment when it is beneficial to all, integrating electricity, heating, cooling, transport, water, buildings, industry, forestry and agriculture systems.

The Centre organizes courses, summer schools, public lectures, seminars and workshops in order to promote sustainable development of energy, water and environment systems and provides professional opinion on issues of sustainability and sustainability metrics. The Centre also organizes a series of international SDEWES conferences for scientists to discuss issues of sustainability of energy, water and environment system. Through these actions, SDEWES Centre aims to provide a research platform that will provide comprehensive R&D activities, assessment and consultation on the research subjects of sustainable development.

== History ==
SDEWES started as a project co-funded by CORDIS under the FP5 – INCO 2 programme in 2002, when first Dubrovnik Conference on Sustainable Development of Energy, Water and Environment Systems was organized. Partners in this project were University of Zagreb and Instituto Superior Técnico (Lisbon). After the organisation of three more conferences in 2003, 2005 and 2007, SDEWES Centre was established in 2009. Since then, eight more conferences were organized in 2009, 2011, 2012, 2013, 2014, 2015 and 2016. As a separate regional event, the SEE SDEWES Conferences are held every two years, starting with 2014 in Ohrid. The 2nd SEE SDEWES Conference was held in Piran.

== International Scientific Committee ==
The Committee is made of leading researchers (half of them are on the top 2% Stanford list of most influential scientists), and several are Editors-in-chief of leading journals (Energy, Journal of Cleaner Production, Journal of Environmental Management, Renewable Energy, Applied Energy).

- Henrik Lund, Chair, Aalborg University, Aalborg, Denmark
- Neven Duić, Co-chair, University of Zagreb, Zagreb, Croatia
- Felipe Feijoo, Co-chair for the Americas, Pontifical Catholic University of Valparaiso, Valparaíso, Chile
- Natasha Markovska, Co-Chair for the Eastern Europe, Research Center for Energy and Sustainable Development - Macedonian Academy of Sciences and Arts, Skopje, North Macedonia
- Brian Vad Mathiesen, Co-Chair for Northern Europe, Aalborg University, Aalborg, Denmark
- Mousa Mohsen, Co-Chair for the Middle East and Africa, Commission for Academic Accreditation, Abu Dhabi, United Arab Emirates
- Antonio Piacentino, Co-Chair for Southern Europe, University of Palermo, Palermo, Italy
- Ingo Stadler, Co-Chair for Western Europe, TH Köln, Cologne, Germany
- Poul Alberg Østergaard [da], Aalborg University, Aalborg, Denmark
- Ofelia Araujo, Federal University of Rio de Janeiro, Rio de Janeiro, Brazil
- Davide Astiaso Garcia, University of Rome La Sapienza, Rome, Italy
- Susana Boeykens, Universidad de Buenos Aires, Buenos Aires, Argentina
- Annamaria Buonomano, University of Naples Federico II, Napoli, Italy
- Francesco Calise, University of Naples Federico II, Napoli, Italy
- Maria da Graça Carvalho, Instituto Superior Técnico, Lisbon, Portugal
- Raf Dewil, KU Leuven, Leuven, Belgium
- Zvonimir Guzović, University of Zagreb, Zagreb, Croatia
- Şiir KILKIŞ, The Scientific and Technological Research Council of Turkey, Ankara, Turkey
- Soteris Kalogirou, Cyprus University of Technology, Limassol, Cyprus
- Tarik Kupusović, University of Sarajevo, Sarajevo, Bosnia and Herzegovina
- Christos N. Markides, Imperial College London, London, United Kingdom
- Henning Meschede, University Paderborn, Paderborn, Germany
- Carla Montagud Montalvá, Universitat Politecnica de Valencia, Valencia, Spain
- Benedetto Nastasi, Tor Vergata University of Rome, Rome, Italy
- Adolfo Palombo, University of Naples Federico II, Napoli, Italy
- Nikola Rajaković, University of Belgrade, Belgrade, Serbia
- Daniel Rolph Schneider, University of Zagreb, Zagreb, Croatia
- Rodney Stewart, Griffith University, Gold Coast City, Australia
- Krzysztof Urbaniec, Warsaw University of Technology, Plock, Poland
- Petar Sabev Varbanov, Brno University of Technology - VUT, Brno, Czech Republic
- Qiuwang Wang, Xi'an Jiaotong University, Shaanxi, China
- Kledi Xhaxhiu, Faculty of Natural Sciences, University of Tirana, Tirana, Albania
- Aleksander Zidanšek, Jožef Stefan International Postgraduate School, Ljubljana, Slovenia
- Kemal Hanjalic, Delft University of Technology, Delft, Netherlands
- Viatcheslav Kafarov, Industrial University of Santander, Bucaramanga, Colombia
- Walter Leal Filho, Hamburg University of Applied Sciences, Hamburg, Germany
- Vladimir Lipovac, University of Dubrovnik, Dubrovnik, Croatia
- Simeon Oka, Institute Vinča, Belgrade, Serbia
- Nikola Ružinski, University of Zagreb, Zagreb, Croatia
- Eduardo SERRA, Universidade Federal do Rio de Janeiro, Rio de Janeiro, Brazil
- Subhas K. Sikdar, Cincinnati, United States
- Ivo Šlaus, Ruđer Bošković Institute, Zagreb, Croatia
- Xiliang Zhang, Tsinghua University, Beijing, China

== SDEWES sections ==
New section of SDEWES Centre, SDEWES-Skopje or Macedonian section, is established in Skopje, North Macedonia, with the goal to gather professionals and scientists from broad range of disciplines, particularly located in the Southeast Europe, in order to provide scientific support for wise policy-making. SDEWES-Skopje aims to extend the activities at regional level including the other EU candidate and potential candidate countries, as well as EU neighbourhood countries to foster regional coordination in providing feasible solutions for the common challenges and gaining synergy effects.

The second section of SDEWES Centre, Serbian section, has been founded in 2018.

== Membership ==
According to the Statute of SDEWES Centre, every person can under the same circumstances apply for membership.

== Conferences ==
Up to 2011, SDEWES Conference was organized as biennial conference in Dubrovnik, Croatia. From the year 2012, it is an annual event but with a geographic regime. Every two years the conference is held in Dubrovnik, and in the years between on different locations.

The SDEWES 2012 Conference was held in Ohrid, and in 2014 on a cruise ship travelling between Venice and Istanbul.

In 2014, the first regional SEE SDEWES conference was held in Ohrid, Macedonia focused on South East Europe.

In 2015, the 10th Conference on SDEWES was held in Dubrovnik. 540 scientists from over 65 countries participated.

In 2016, the second regional SEE SDEWES conference was held in Piran, Slovenia.

Also in 2016, the 11th SDEWES Conference was held in Lisbon, Portugal.

In 2017, the 12th SDEWES Conference was held in Dubrovnik.

In 2018, the 1st LATIN AMERICAN SDEWES Conference was held in Rio de Janeiro, Brazil, and the third regional SEE (Southeast European) SDEWES conference was held in Novi Sad, Serbia.

Also in 2018 year, the 13th SDEWES Conference was held in Palermo, Italy.

In 2019, the 14th Conference on SDEWES was held in Dubrovnik.

In 2020, there were 4 SDEWES Conferences, the 2nd Latin American SDEWES Conference (Buenos Aires, Argentina), 1st Asia Pacific SDEWES Conference (Gold Coast, Australia), 4th South East Europe SDEWES Conference (Sarajevo, Bosnia and Herzegovina) and 15th SDEWES Conference (Cologne, Germany), and they have delivered around 700 presentations devoted to various sustainability topics.

In 2021, the 16th Conference on SDEWES was held in Dubrovnik with 630 scientists and researchers from 58 countries who participated.

In 2022, the fifth regional SEE SDEWES conference was held in Vlorë, Albania and the third LATIN AMERICAN SDEWES Conference was held in São Paulo, Brazil

Also in 2022 year, the 17th SDEWES Conference was held in Paphos, Cyprus.

In 2023, the 18th Conference on SDEWES was held in Dubrovnik with 646 scientists and researchers from 58 countries.

In 2024, there were 3 SDEWES Conferences, the 4th Latin American SDEWES Conference (Vina del Mar, Chile), the 2nd Asia Pacific SDEWES Conference (Gold Coast, Australia), and 19th SDEWES Conference (Rome, Italy), with 700 scientists, researchers, and experts.

In 2025 year, the first African SDEWES Conference is planned to be held in Oujda / Saidia, Morocco, and the 20th SDEWES Conference will held in Dubrovnik.

Work presented at the conferences are published in scientific journals and among them, in Renewable and Sustainable Energy Reviews, Energy Conversion and Management, Applied Energy, Journal of Cleaner Production, Journal of Environmental Management, Energy, Renewable Energy, Fuel, International Journal of Hydrogen Energy, Applied Thermal Engineering, Energy reports, Energies, Thermal Science, International Journal of Sustainable Energy Planning and Management, Smart Energy and Journal of Sustainable Development of Energy, Water and Environment Systems

== Journal ==
SDEWES Centre is publishing research open access Journal of Sustainable Development of Energy, Water and Environment Systems (JSDEWES) since 2013. Journal is indexed in Scopus and Emerging Science Citation Index.

== Research ==
SDEWES Centre forms research teams from the pool of members to participate in research projects.

SDEWES Centre has been involved in two FP7 projects, three Horizon 2020 projects, one EMFF / EASME project for blue economy, three projects under the Interreg fund, one project under the EUKI fund, one project under the EEA and Norway Grants and one project under the European Strategy for Danube Region (EUSDR) fund START.

SDEWES-Skopje (Macedonian section) has also been involved in several projects, including four Horizon 2020 projects

== SDEWES Index ==
In line with the aims of the SDEWES Center, an index is also developed to benchmark the performance of cities across aspects that are related to energy, water and environment systems. With the namesake of the Center, the SDEWES Index consists of 7 dimensions, 35 indicators, and close to 25 sub-indicators. It is currently applied to 120 cities.
