= Neven Duić =

Croatian engineering professor at the University of Zagreb

- Born: 25 April 1965 (age 61); Zagreb, SR Croatia, SFR Yugoslavia
- Citizenship: Croatian
- Occupations: Mechanical engineering, Energy
- Awards: Annual State Prize for Science (2017)

Neven Duić (born April 1965) is a Croatian engineering professor at the University of Zagreb and vice president of the Croatian Academy of Engineering.

== Biography ==
Duić was born in Zagreb, where he attended elementary school and secondary school "MIOC" (today XV Gymnasium). On the University of Zagreb he studied mechanical engineering, and 2 years of Portuguese language on Faculty of Humanities and Social Sciences, University of Zagreb. He graduated on Faculty of Mechanical Engineering and Naval Architecture, University of Zagreb in 1990, received his PhD in 1998 and became full professor in 2011, at the Power Engineering and Energy Management Chair at the Department of Energy, Power and Environmental Engineering at the same faculty. He was a visiting researcher and a postdoctoral researcher at the Instituto Superior Técnico (Lisbon, Portugal) on six occasions, between 1994 and 2003, and Visiting Professor between 2024 and 2026.

Neven Duić belongs to the 2% of the most cited scientists in the world for 2020 - 2024 years, according to the public list prepared by a group of researchers from Stanford University using Scopus database. He published over 650 scientific papers, of which 203 in the journals listed in Science Citation Index Expanded. His scientific papers have been cited over 18,400 times in Scopus and over 13,400 times in WoS., H-index according to the Scopus database is 73, and according to WoS database 63.

He gave more than 170 invited and keynote lectures. He has participated in over 100 scientific and professional projects, mainly international projects, in the areas of energy policy and planning, energy economics, policy of sustainable development and resource planning, climate change mitigation, combustion engineering and modelling, research and innovation policy.

He is active in various media, participating at round tables public lectures, radio and TV shows.

== Memberships ==
Since 2012 he is a full member of Croatian Academy of Engineering, and its vice-president in the term 2022-2026 During 2022 he was a President-Elect of International Council of Academies of Engineering and Technological Sciences (CAETS).

Prof. Duić is the president of SDEWES Centre since 2009, and Co-chair of SDEWES International Scientific Committee, as well. He was the president of the Adria Section of the Combustion Institute (ASCI) in the term 2008-2018 and since 2018 he is the member of the Management Board. He has organised the series of conferences on Sustainable Development of Energy, Water and Environment Systems (SDEWES) and was a member of organising, scientific and programming committees of more than 70 scientific meetings. Since 2021, he has been a co-chair of the Energy steering panel of the European Academies' Science Advisory Council (EASAC), and since 2019 year, a deputy member of the Innovation Council for Industry of the Republic of Croatia at the National Council for Science, Higher Education and Technological Development.

He is Editor-in-chief of "Journal of Sustainable Development of Energy, Water and Environment Systems", senior editor of journal e-Prime, subject editor for journal “Energy”, associate editor of "Energy Storage and Saving", and editor of journals Energy Conversion and Management and International Journal of Sustainable Energy Planning and Management. Also, he is member of editorial boards of journals Smart Energy, eTransportation, Applied Energy, Thermal Science and International Transaction Journal of Engineering, Management, & Applied Sciences & Technologies.

== Awards ==
Prof. Duić has received numerous prestigious awards and recognitions for his scientific work:

- 2008 – from University of Zagreb for improvement of international relations achieved under an international scientific project
- 2017 – National Science Award for significant scientific achievement in 2016 in the field of technical sciences, for scientific research aimed at sustainable energy development
- 2018 – Great Medal from Faculty of Mechanical Engineering and Naval Architecture - for an exceptional contribution to the improvement of work, development and promotion of the Faculty
- 2021 – Medal Atanasije Stojković from Society of Thermal Engineers of Serbia
