= Brian Vad Mathiesen =

Danish engineer and professor

Brian Vad Mathiesen (born 10 October 1978) is a Danish engineer and professor at Aalborg University. He was listed among ISI Highly Cited researchers in 2015 and 2016, making him one of the leading engineers in the world.

== Life and research activity ==
Mathiesen studied environmental management at Aalborg university and obtained a MSc. Eng. in 2003. From 2004 to 2005 he worked as an energy and environmental planner, then returned to university. In 2008 he finished his PhD thesis and was named assistant professor at Aalborg University. Besides he served as a guest professor and visiting researcher at University of Zagreb. From 2010 to 2013 he was associate professor at Aalborg University and in 2014 he became full professor.

Mathiesen researches 100% renewable energy systems and paths to transition the energy system to 100% renewable sources. He is also doing feasibility studies and technical energy system analyses and works on ways to base energy systems mainly on variable renewable energy sources such as wind power.

In 2020 he became editor-in-chief of the newly founded scientific journal Smart Energy.

== Publications (selection) ==
- A. Hauch, R. Küngas, P. Blennow, A. B. Hansen, J. B. Hansen, B.V. Mathiesen, M. B. Mogensen: Recent advances in solid oxide cell technology for electrolysis. Science 370, 186, 2020, doi:10.1126/science.aba6118
- Henrik Lund et al.: The status of 4th generation district heating: Research and results. In: Energy 164, (2018), 147–159, doi:10.1016/j.energy.2018.08.206.
- D. Connolly, H. Lund, B. V. Mathiesen: Smart Energy Europe :The technical and economic impact of one potential 100% renewable energy scenario for the European Union. In: Renewable and Sustainable Energy Reviews 60, (2016), 1634–1653, doi:10.1016/j.rser.2016.02.025.
- B. V. Mathiesen, H. Lund, D. Conolly, H. Wenzel, P.A. Østergaard, B. Möller, S. Nielsen, I. Ridjan, P. Karnøe, K. Sperling, F. K. Hvelplund, Smart Energy Systems for coherent 100% renewable energy and transport solutions. In: Applied Energy 145, (2015), 139–154, doi:10.1016/j.apenergy.2015.01.075.
- D. Connolly, H. Lund, B.V. Mathiesen, S. Werner, B. Möller, U. Persson, T. Boermans, D. Trier, P.A. Østergaard, S. Nielsen, Heat Roadmap Europe: Combining district heating with heat savings to decarbonise the EU energy system. In: Energy Policy 65, (2014), 475–489, doi:10.1016/j.enpol.2013.10.035.
- H. Lund, B. V. Mathiesen, The role of Carbon Capture and Storage in a future sustainable energy system. In: Energy 44, Issue 1, (2012) 469–476, doi:10.1016/j.energy.2012.06.002.
- H. Lund, A. N. Andersen, P. A. Østergaard, B. V. Mathiesen, D. Conolly, From electricity smart grids to smart energy systems – A market operation based approach and understanding. In: Energy 42, Issue 1, (2012) 96–102, doi:10.1016/j.energy.2012.04.003.
- B. V. Mathiesen, H. Lund, K. Karlsson, 100% Renewable energy systems, climate mitigation and economic growth. In: Applied Energy 88, Issue 2, (2011) 488–501, doi:10.1016/j.apenergy.2010.03.001.
- D. Conolly, H. Lund, B.V. Mathiesen, M Leahy, A review of computer tools for analysing the integration of renewable energy into various energy systems. In: Applied Energy 87, Issue 4, (2010), 1059–1082, doi:10.1016/j.apenergy.2009.09.026.
- H. Lund, B. Möller, B.V. Mathiesen, A. Dyrelund, The role of district heating in future renewable energy systems. In: Energy 35, Issue 3, (2010), 1381–1390, doi:10.1016/j.energy.2009.11.023.
- B.V. Mathiesen, H. Lund, Comparative analyses of seven technologies to facilitate the integration of fluctuating renewable energy sources. In: IET Renewable Power Generation 3, Issue 2, (2009), 190–204, link.
- H. Lund, B.V. Mathiesen, Energy system analysis of 100% renewable energy systems - The case of Denmark in years 2030 and 2050. In: Energy 34, Issue 5, (2009), 524–531, doi:10.1016/j.energy.2008.04.003.
- B.V. Mathiesen, H. Lund, P. Nørgaard, Integrated transport and renewable energy systems. In: Utilities Policy 16, Issue 2, (2008), 107–116, doi:10.1016/j.jup.2007.11.007.
