= Henrik Lund (academic) =

Danish engineer and professor (born 1960)

Henrik Lund (born 1960) is a Danish engineer and professor at Aalborg University.

== Life and research activity ==
Lund studied engineering at Aalborg university and other universities and obtained a Master's degree in 1985. In 1990 he finished his PhD and in 2009 he became Dr.Techn. In 1990 he was named assistant professor at Aalborg University, got associate professor in 1993 and became full professor in 2006.

As of October 2017 his h-index is 43 (Web of Science) respectively 47 (Scopus) and is a member of The Danish Academy of Technical Sciences. He is listed among ISI Highly Cited researchers.

He is editor-in-chief of scientific journal Energy, ranking 12th out of 89 journals in "Energy & Fuels" according to the Journal Citation Reports.

== Books and reports (selection) ==
- Henrik Lund, Renewable Energy Systems: A Smart Energy Systems Approach to the Choice and Modeling of 100 % Renewable Solutions, Academic Press 2014, ISBN 978-0-124-10423-5.

== Journal papers (selection) ==
- Hansen, Kenneth; et al. (2019). "Status and perspectives on 100% renewable energy systems" (PDF). Energy. 175: 471–480. doi:10.1016/j.energy.2019.03.092.
- Henrik Lund et al.: The status of 4th generation district heating: Research and results. In: Energy 164, (2018), 147–159, doi:10.1016/j.energy.2018.08.206.
- D. Connolly, H. Lund, B. V. Mathiesen: Smart Energy Europe: The technical and economic impact of one potential 100% renewable energy scenario for the European Union. In: Renewable and Sustainable Energy Reviews 60, (2016), 1634–1653, doi:10.1016/j.rser.2016.02.025.
- B.V. Mathiesen, H. Lund, D. Conolly, H. Wenzel, P.A. Østergaard, B. Möller, S. Nielsen, I. Ridjan, P. Karnøe, K. Sperling, F. K. Hvelplund, Smart Energy Systems for coherent 100% renewable energy and transport solutions. In: Applied Energy 145, (2015), 139–154, doi:10.1016/j.apenergy.2015.01.075.
- H. Lund, S. Werner, R. Wiltshire, S. Svendsen, J. E. Thorsen, F. Hvelplund, B. V. Mathiesen, 4th Generation District Heating (4GDH): Integrating smart thermal grids into future sustainable energy systems. In: Energy 68, (2014), Pages 1–11, doi:10.1016/j.energy.2014.02.089.
- D. Connolly, H. Lund, B.V. Mathiesen, S. Werner, B. Möller, U. Persson, T. Boermans, D. Trier, P.A. Østergaard, S. Nielsen, Heat Roadmap Europe: Combining district heating with heat savings to decarbonise the EU energy system. In: Energy Policy 65, (2014), 475–489, doi:10.1016/j.enpol.2013.10.035.
- H. Lund, B. V. Mathiesen, The role of Carbon Capture and Storage in a future sustainable energy system. In: Energy 44, Issue 1, (2012) 469–476, doi:10.1016/j.energy.2012.06.002.
- H. Lund, A. N. Andersen, P. A. Østergaard, B. V. Mathiesen, D. Conolly, From electricity smart grids to smart energy systems – A market operation based approach and understanding. In: Energy 42, Issue 1, (2012) 96–102, doi:10.1016/j.energy.2012.04.003.
- B. V. Mathiesen, H. Lund, K. Karlsson, 100% Renewable energy systems, climate mitigation and economic growth. In: Applied Energy 88, Issue 2, (2011) 488–501, doi:10.1016/j.apenergy.2010.03.001.
- D. Conolly, H. Lund, B.V. Mathiesen, M Leahy, A review of computer tools for analysing the integration of renewable energy into various energy systems. In: Applied Energy 87, Issue 4, (2010), 1059–1082, doi:10.1016/j.apenergy.2009.09.026.
- H. Lund, B. Möller, B.V. Mathiesen, A. Dyrelund, The role of district heating in future renewable energy systems. In: Energy 35, Issue 3, (2010), 1381–1390, doi:10.1016/j.energy.2009.11.023.
- H. Lund, B.V. Mathiesen, Energy system analysis of 100% renewable energy systems - The case of Denmark in years 2030 and 2050. In: Energy 34, Issue 5, (2009), 524–531, doi:10.1016/j.energy.2008.04.003.
- H. Lund, W. Kempton, Integration of renewable energy into the transport and electricity sectors through V2G. In: Energy Policy 36, Issue 9, (2008), 3578–3587, doi:10.1016/j.enpol.2008.06.007.
- H. Lund, Renewable energy strategies for sustainable development. In: Energy 32, Issue 6, (2007), 912–919, doi:10.1016/j.energy.2006.10.017.
- H. Lund, Large-scale integration of wind power into different energy systems. In: Energy 30, Issue 13, (2005), 2402–2412, doi:10.1016/j.energy.2004.11.001.
