= Scartazzini (surname) =

Scartazzini is a surname. Notable people with the surname include:

- Andrea Lorenzo Scartazzini (born 1971), Swiss composer
- Giovanni Andrea Scartazzini (1837–1901), Protestant pastor and Italian-Swiss literary critic

== See also ==
- Scartezzini
