= Soteris Kalogirou =

Cypriot academic

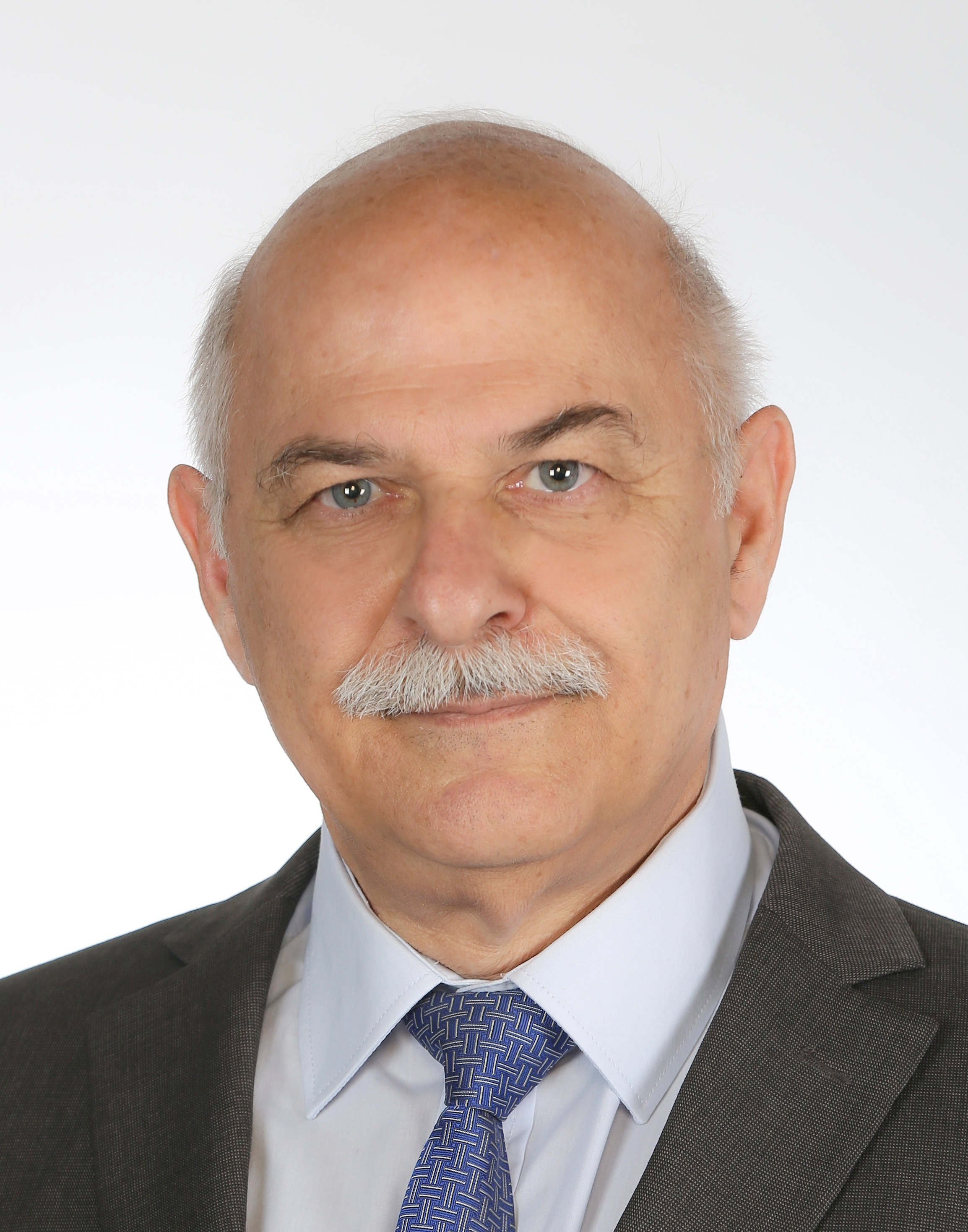
- Born: Trachonas, Nicosia, Cyprus
- Education: University of Glamorgan
- Known for: Solar thermal systems, Renewable energy, Artificial intelligence in energy systems
- Honors: Member, Academia Europaea (2024); Member, Cyprus Academy of Sciences, Letters and Arts (2019); Fellow of the European Academy of Sciences (2019); Member, International Solar Energy Society (since 1992); Member, World Renewable Energy Network (since 1992)
- Scientific career
- Fields: Mechanical engineering, Solar energy, Renewable energy systems
- Workplaces: Cyprus University of Technology

Soteris Kalogirou is a Cypriot mechanical engineer and academic whose work focuses on solar energy, renewable energy systems, and the application of artificial intelligence in energy technologies. He is a professor at the Cyprus University of Technology.

== Early life and education ==
Kalogirou was born in Trachonas, a suburb of Nicosia, Cyprus. He earned a Ph.D. in Mechanical Engineering from the University of Glamorgan in 1995. His post-doctoral research examined the use of artificial intelligence methods for the analysis and simulation of solar energy systems.

== Career ==
From 1982 to 1987, Kalogirou worked as a Building Services Consultant at Intersol Engineering. He subsequently held various academic positions at the Higher Technical Institute of Cyprus between 1987 and 2007.

In 2008, he joined the Cyprus University of Technology, where he is a Professor of Thermodynamics, Heat Transfer and Solar Engineering in the Department of Mechanical Engineering and Materials Science and Engineering.

At the Cyprus University of Technology, he has supervised postgraduate and doctoral students and contributed to the development of research programs in renewable energy. His work has included participation in European and international research initiatives focused on sustainable energy systems and technologies.

Kalogirou's publications have been widely cited in the field of renewable energy engineering, reflecting sustained academic influence in areas related to solar energy utilization and energy system modeling.

He is the founder and director of the Archimedes Solar Energy Laboratory (ASEL) at the Cyprus University of Technology, where a significant portion of his research has been conducted.

== Research and contributions ==
Kalogirou's research contributions are centered on the advancement of solar energy technologies and their integration into practical applications. His work has explored both theoretical modeling and experimental validation of solar thermal systems, including flat-plate collectors, concentrating systems, and building-integrated solar technologies.

He has also contributed to research on solar-driven desalination systems, focusing on methods to enhance freshwater production using sustainable energy sources. In addition, his work has examined hybrid energy systems that combine different renewable technologies to improve overall energy efficiency and reliability. A typical example is the hybrid photovoltaic/thermal collector that combines electricity and thermal energy generation within a single solar panel. This design removes the extra heat generated by photovoltaics, keeping their electrical efficiency at a high level, prolonging their useful life, and utilizing the heat thus collected for useful purposes, such as solar water heating preheating or space air heating.

Kalogirou's research involves experimental and theoretical studies, as well as advanced thermodynamic analysis such as exergy analysis, applied to solar thermal and photovoltaic technologies in buildings, industry, and power generation. His studies have included theoretical modeling and simulation, validated through controlled experiments using a solar simulator and long-term outdoor performance monitoring. Research findings have been applied in various sectors, including residential buildings, schools, office buildings, and industrial systems. Some of his research has been incorporated into commercialized technologies.

=== Editorial roles ===
Kalogirou is currently the Editor-in-Chief of Renewable and Sustainable Energy Reviews since 2025. From 2005 to 2014, he was an Associate Editor of Renewable Energy, followed by a decade as Editor-in-Chief (2014–2024), and currently holds the title of Editor-in-Chief Emeritus.

He was also Associate Editor of the Energy journal (2006–2010), Executive Editor (2010–2012), followed by a decade as Deputy Editor-in-Chief (2013–2023), and currently holds the title of Honorary Editor (2024–present).

== Selected book publications ==
- 2006 – Artificial Intelligence in Energy and Renewable Energy Systems (editor), Nova Science Inc.
- 2009 – Solar Energy Engineering: Processes and Systems (author), First Edition, Academic Press, Elsevier
- 2011 – Soft Computing in Green and Renewable Energy Systems (co-editor), Springer
- 2013 – Comprehensive Renewable Energy, Vol. 3 (volume editor and contributor), Elsevier
- 2014 – Solar Energy Engineering: Processes and Systems (author), Second Edition, Academic Press, Elsevier
- 2016 – Overview of BISTS State of the Art, Models and Applications (editor and contributor), COST Action TU1205
- 2016 – Thermal Solar Desalination: Methods and Systems (co-author with Belessiotis V. and Delyannis E.), Academic Press, Elsevier
- 2017 – Building Integrated Solar Thermal Systems: Design and Applications Handbook (editor and contributor), COST Action TU1205
- 2018 – McEvoy’s Handbook of Photovoltaics (editor and contributor), Academic Press, Elsevier
- 2022 – Solar Thermal Energy (editor and contributor, with Alexopoulos S.), Encyclopedia of Sustainability Science and Technology, Second Edition, Springer Reference
- 2022 – Handbook of Artificial Intelligence Techniques in Photovoltaic Systems: Modelling, Control, Optimization, Forecasting and Fault Diagnosis (co-author with Mellit Adel), Academic Press, Elsevier
- 2023 – Solar Energy Engineering: Processes and Systems (author), Third Edition, Academic Press, Elsevier
- 2026 – Green Hydrogen Energy Systems (author, with other colleagues), Elsevier

== Honors ==
- Member of the International Solar Energy Society since 1992.
- Member of the World Renewable Energy Network (WREN) since 1992.
- Member of the Cyprus Academy of Sciences, Letters and Arts in April 2019.
- Fellow of the European Academy of Sciences (2019)
- Elected Member of the Academia Europaea in 2024.
- Fellow of the International Artificial Intelligence Industry Alliance 2024.
- Representing the Cyprus Academy in the InterAcademy Partnership.
- Representing the Cyprus Academy in the EASAC Energy Program.
- Fellow of the International Academy of Artificial Intelligence Sciences 2024.
- Fellow of the CORE Academy of Sciences and Humanities 2026.
