= Željava =

Village in Croatia

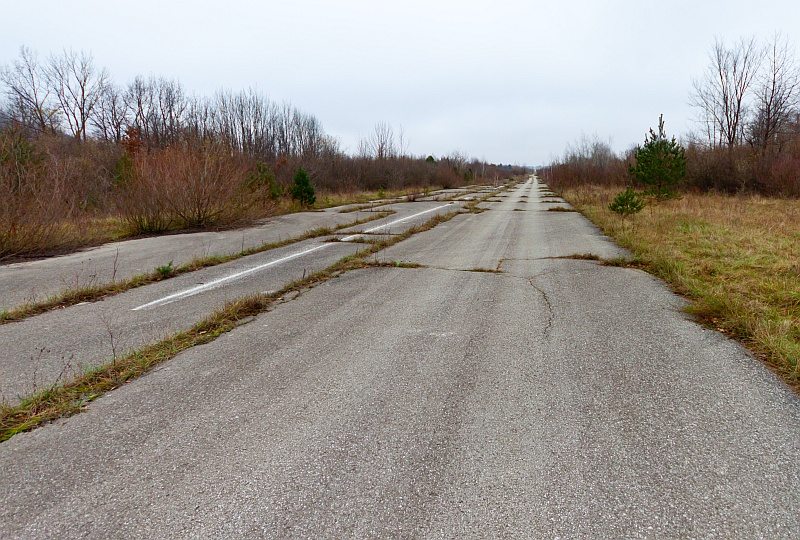
- Željava Air Base

- Location within Croatia
- Coordinates: 44°51′41″N 15°43′57″E
- Country: Croatia
- County: Lika-Senj
- Municipality: Plitvička Jezera
- Founder: Josip Broz Tito

Area
  - Total: 27.0 km^{2} (10.4 sq mi)

Population (2021)
  - Total: 22
  - Density: 0.81/km^{2} (2.1/sq mi)
- Time zone: UTC+1 (CET)
  - Summer (DST): UTC+2 (CEST)

Željava is a village in the Plitvička Jezera municipality, Lika-Senj County, Croatia. It is located between Ličko Petrovo Selo and the border with Bosnia and Herzegovina.

== Demographics ==
Historical population 1857-2011
v

population	69		792	876	951	876	838	853	374	382	455	245	175	150	51	38
	1857	1869	1880	1890	1900	1910	1921	1931	1948	1953	1961	1971	1981	1991	2001	2011

Sources: Croatian Bureau of Statistics publications

NOTE: The 1869 population data is included in the Ličko Petrovo Selo population figure

== Sights ==
- Željava Air Base
