= Yugoslavia and weapons of mass destruction =

Socialist Federal Republic of Yugoslavia
- Nuclear program start date: Early 1950s
- Nuclear program end date: 1987
- NPT party: No (withdrew in 1992)

The Socialist Federal Republic of Yugoslavia began its own nuclear weapons program in the early 1950s, amid rising tensions with the Soviet Union during the Informbiro period. Yugoslavian leader Josip Broz Tito decided that the development of nuclear technology was in the country's best interest as deterrence from a possible invasion and in order to protect the country's sovereignty.

== Nuclear weapons ==
=== Soviet-assisted research for the creation of weapons of mass destruction (1947–1948) ===
The history of nuclear weaponry development in Yugoslavia started in 1947, when the realisation of a state nuclear program was assigned to Pavle Savić. Pavle was soon after put in charge of the Institute for Physics, which one year later, upon its construction, would be renamed to "Vinča Nuclear Institute". The construction of the site seemed to have been ordered by the Soviet Union, which wanted to make it a branch of the Moscow Institute of Physical Problems, with Soviet scientists that had previously worked with Pyotr Kapitsa being sent to Yugoslavia in early 1948, when the first researches of the Yugoslav Institute for Physics began. A CIA report, released to the public in December 2001, suggested that at that time there was not only civilian research occurring in the institute, but also facilities and divisions (reactors, isotope separation) that were typically relevant for weapons-oriented nuclear infrastructure. Despite earlier cooperation with the Soviets, after the Soviet-Yugoslav split in 1948, the Soviets cut funds to the Yugoslav nuclear program, and Yugoslavia had to rely on its own resources from then on. It is proven that one of the objectives of this earlier Soviet-assisted, and later independent nuclear research was the production of weapons of mass destruction for Yugoslavia's arsenal.

=== Independent Yugoslav nuclear research (1948–1987) ===
To protect Yugoslavia's national sovereignty and gain international status, the regime of Josip Broz Tito began another nuclear weapons program in the early 1950s from scratch. Yugoslavia would later sign the Non-Proliferation Treaty, which caused the program to shut down. Another nuclear weapons program was started after India tested their nuclear weapons on May 18, 1974. This program would eventually shut down in 1987, but Yugoslavia (and eventually the Republic of Serbia) kept high grade enriched uranium until 2010, where they then gave their uranium to the Russian Federation.

== Chemical weapons ==
Before the Yugoslavian breakup and the Yugoslav Wars, the Yugoslavian government was able to develop and store several different types of chemical weapons such as mustard gas, sarin agent and blister agents. Mustard gas was prepared and installed at the Prva Iskra factory in the town of Baric.

== Missile program ==
The Yugoslavian government allegedly worked with Libya and Iraq to develop missiles, cruise missiles and anti-naval/land attack missiles capable of carrying weapons of mass destruction and conventional warheads. Serbia is currently the only former Yugoslav member with a missile program.

== Alleged use in the Yugoslav Wars ==
During the Yugoslav Wars, the Yugoslav Army (Federal Republic of Yugoslavia) allegedly used chemical weapons in combat against Bosnian and Croat separatists. Chemical weapons were not confirmed to have been used in the Yugoslav wars by either sides.

== See also ==
- Armijska Ratna Komanda D-0, a Yugoslav nuclear bunker
