= Journal of Sustainable Development of Energy, Water and Environment Systems =

- Discipline: Energy, sustainability studies
- Language: English
- Edited by: Neven Duić

Publication details
- History: 2013-present
- Publisher: International Centre for Sustainable Development of Energy, Water and Environment Systems (Croatia)
- Frequency: Quarterly
- Open access: Yes
- License: Creative Commons Attribution 3.0 Unported

Standard abbreviations
- ISO 4: J. Sustain. Dev. Energy Water Environ. Syst.

Indexing
- ISSN: 1848-9257
- OCLC no.: 856662034

Links
- Journal homepage

The Journal of Sustainable Development of Energy, Water and Environment Systems is a quarterly peer-reviewed open-access scientific journal covering sustainability studies. The editor-in-chief is Neven Duić (University of Zagreb).

== Abstracting and indexing ==
The journal is abstracted and indexed in the Emerging Sources Citation Index and Scopus. According to the Journal Citation Reports, the journal has a 2022 impact factor of 2.1.
