= Jean-Louis Scartezzini =

Swiss building physicist specialized in daylighting

Professor Jean-Louis Scartezzini
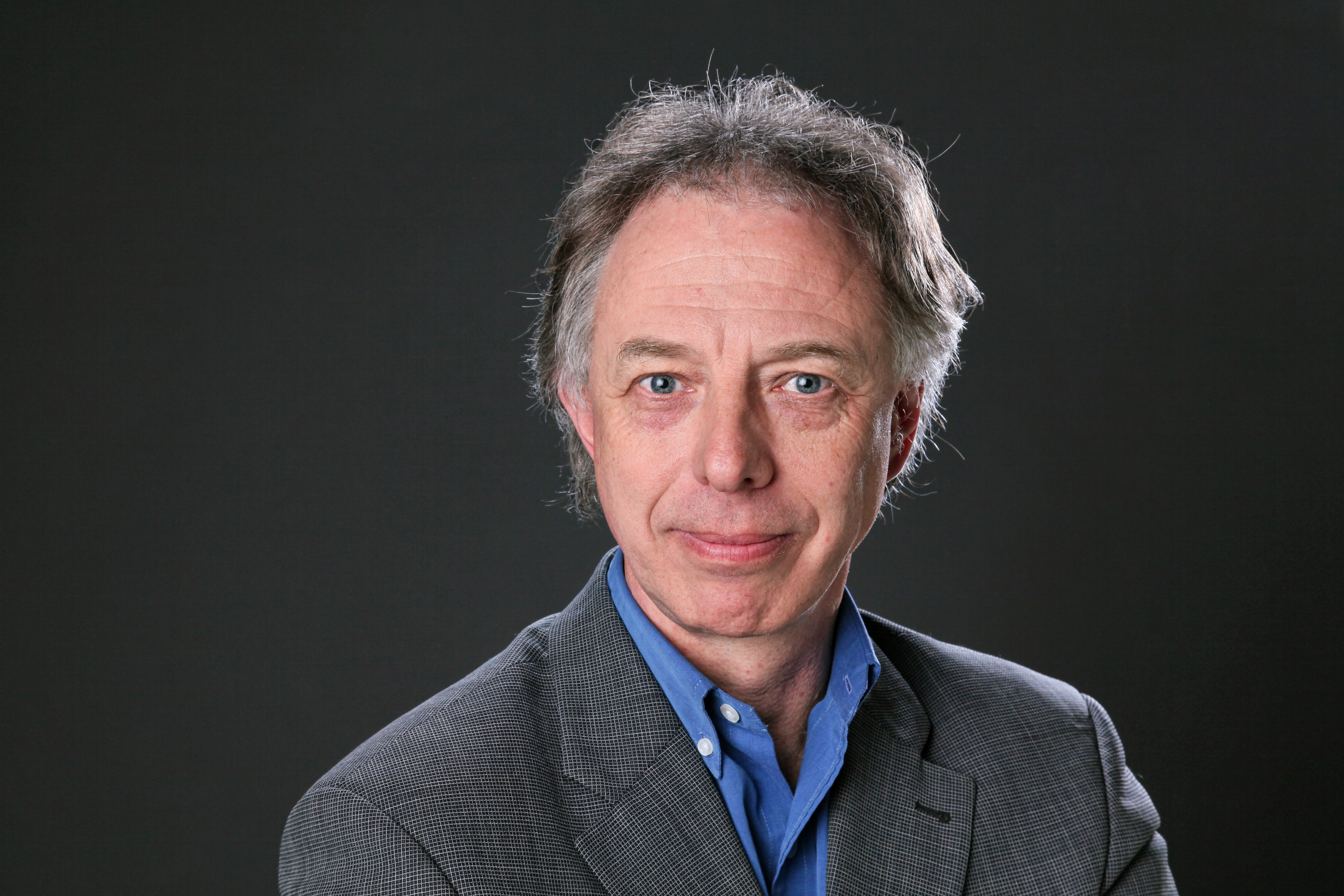
- Jean-Louis Scartezzini in 2011
- Born: 1957 (age 68–69); Lausanne
- Citizenship: Swiss

Academic background
- Education: Physics; Geophysics
- Alma mater: University of Lausanne; EPFL; Colorado State University
- Thesis: Application des méthodes stochastiques à l'étude des systèmes de captage de l'énergie solaire (1986)
- Doctoral advisor: André P. Faist; Thomas Liebling

Academic work
- Discipline: Physics
- Sub-discipline: Building science
- Institutions: EPFL (École Polytechnique Fédérale de Lausanne)
- Website: https://leso.epfl.ch/

Jean-Louis Scartezzini (born 1957 in Lausanne) is a Swiss building physicist specialized in day lighting and solar buildings. He is a professor of physics at EPFL (École Polytechnique Fédérale de Lausanne) and the head of the Solar Energy and Building Physics Laboratory (LESO-PB) since 1994.

== Ecucation ==
Scartezzini studied both physics at EPFL and geophysics at the University of Lausanne, and obtained his Masters's degrees in 1980 and 1981, respectively. As a PhD student he joined the Solar Energy Research Group of André P. Faist at EPFL, and in 1984 for a year the Solar Energy Application Laboratory (SEAL) at Colorado State University as a visiting scholar. He graduated from EPFL at the Department of Physics in 1986 with a PhD thesis on "Application of Stochastic Methods to the Analysis of Solar Energy Systems."

== Career ==
He joined the Windows and Lighting Program at Lawrence Berkeley National Laboratory in California as a post-doctoral fellow in 1988 to work on daylighting and green lighting technologies, and air infiltration and ventilation.

From 1990 to 1997, he was associate professor of building physics at the School of Architecture and the University Center for the Study of Energy Problems at the University of Geneva. In 1994, he was nominated associate professor of building physics at EPFL, director of the Solar Energy and Building Physics Laboratory and co-director of Institute of Building Technology (ITB) at EPFL's Departement of Architecture. Upon his appointment as full professor at EPFL in 1999, he founded and headed the Institute of Infrastructures, Resources and Environment (ICARE) of the School of Environmental, Architectural and Civil Engineering (ENAC), as well as the Doctoral Program in Environment of EPFL.

== Research ==
Scartezzini's research focuses in an interdisciplinary manner on energy efficiency and application of renewable energies in buildings and neighborhoods. His main working areas are dedicated to the integration of daylighting and electric lighting; the application of nanotechnologies for solar energy harvesting; the implementation of data mining, intelligence and simulation in urban districts; the realisation of smart buildings and cities; and the integration of renewable energies in buildings.

Drawing on various scientific fields, Scartezzin's research facilities maintain a nanotechnological laboratory for solar energy conversion, experimental testbeds, such as the LESO solar experimental building, a daylighting and photo-biological laboratory, and an urban climate monitoring station. He is also involved in the development of computer modelling software for design, analyses and optimal control of buildings and cities.

Scartezzini is author or co-author of several books related to daylighting and green lighting, such as Changing Perspectives on Daylight: Science, Technology and Engineers (Science/AAS, 2017), Daylight Design of Buildings: a Handbook for Architects and Engineers (Routledge, 2002), Daylighting Design: A Source Book on Daylighting Systems and Components (LBNL, 2000); Lighting Principles; Office Lighting; Industrial Lighting; and Lighting of Commercial Buildings (Swiss Federal Office of Energy, 1994).

== Distinctions ==
=== Awards ===
Scartezzini is the recipient of 2018 Nonimaging Optics Best Paper Award (San Diego/USA 2019) by the International Society for Optics and Photonics (SPIE), 2017 Outstanding Paper Award at the International Conference on Advanced Electromaterials (ICAE), 2015 Prix SIA Section vaudoise, 2013 Solar Energy Best Paper Award, the 2001/2002 European Solar Prize, and the Welsh-Weston bronze medal of the Chartered Institution of Building and Service Engineers.

He is a Valued Associate Editor at the journal Solar Energy (since 2008), Guest Editor for special issues related to CISBAT international conference cycle in the Journal of Physics: Conference Series (2019), Energy Procedia (2017), Energy and Building (1999, 2001, 2011), Solar Energy (2003, 2005, 2007) and an Honorary Member of the Swiss Solar Energy Society (since 1995).

=== Memberships ===
He has been a member of board of the Swiss Competence Center for Energy Research on Future Energy Efficient Buildings and Districts (2013–2020), member of Swiss Academy of Arts and Sciences (since 2018), speaker of International Daylight Academy (since 2016), member of WEF Global Agenda Council on Sustainable Energy (2007–2008), chairman of Research Commission of the Swiss Competence Centre for Energy and Mobility (2005–2014), member of the energy committee of the Swiss Academy for Engineering Sciences (1999–2007), national liaison officer for Switzerland in the ISES Europe board of directors (1990–1995), president of the Swiss Solar Energy Society (1987–1995) and member of the Swiss Federal experts committee for Solar Energy Applications (1987–1998).

=== Start-ups ===
Scartezzini has been involved in the initiation of several start-up companies such as ShadeMe, kaemco, SwissINSO, Solstis, Estia, Rhyner énergie and E4tech Software.

Scartezzini's lab has also issued numerous patents in the field of lighting control, nano-technologies for solar energy conversion and advanced glazing technologies, leading to the launch of start-up and/or spin-off.

=== Press ===
Scartezzini's research was featured in various media outlet such as The Daily Californian, RTS, Environment Magazine, NZZ, and Le Temps.

== Selected works ==
- Walch A., Castello R., Mohajeri N. and Scartezzini J.-L (2020). Big Data mining for the estimation of hourly rooftop photovoltaïc potential and its uncertainty. Applied Energy, 262, 114404. doi:10.1016/j.apenergy.2019.114404.
- Perera, A.T.D., Coccolo, S., Scartezzini, J.-L., and Mauree, D. (2018). Quantifying the impact of urban climate by extending the boundaries of urban energy modelling. Applied Energy 222:847–860. doi:10.1016/j.apenergy.2018.04.004.
- Maierova, L., Borisuit, A., Scartezzini, J.-L., Jaeggi, S.M., Schmidt, C., and Münch, M. (2016). Diurnal variations of hormonal secretion, alertness and cognition in extreme chronotypes under different lighting conditions. Nature Scientific Reports, 6 33591. doi:10.1038/srep33591.
- Page, J.; Robinson, D.; Morel, N.; Scartezzini, J.-L. (2008). "A generalised stochastic model for the simulation of occupant presence". Energy and Buildings. 40 (2): 83–98. Bibcode:2008EneBu..40...83P. doi:10.1016/j.enbuild.2007.01.018.
- Coccolo, Silvia; Kämpf, Jérôme; Scartezzini, Jean-Louis; Pearlmutter, David (2016). "Outdoor human comfort and thermal stress: A comprehensive review on models and standards". Urban Climate. 18: 33–57. Bibcode:2016UrbCl..18...33C. doi:10.1016/j.uclim.2016.08.004.
- Fritsch, R.; Kohler, A.; Nygård-Ferguson, M.; Scartezzini, J.-L. (1990). "A stochastic model of user behaviour regarding ventilation". Building and Environment. 25 (2): 173–181. Bibcode:1990BuEnv..25..173F. doi:10.1016/0360-1323(90)90030-U.
- Scartezzini, Jean-Louis; Courret, Gilles (2002). "Anidolic daylighting systems". Solar Energy. 73 (2): 123–135. Bibcode:2002SoEn...73..123S. doi:10.1016/S0038-092X(02)00040-3.
