= Maria da Graça Carvalho =

Portuguese politician (born 1955)

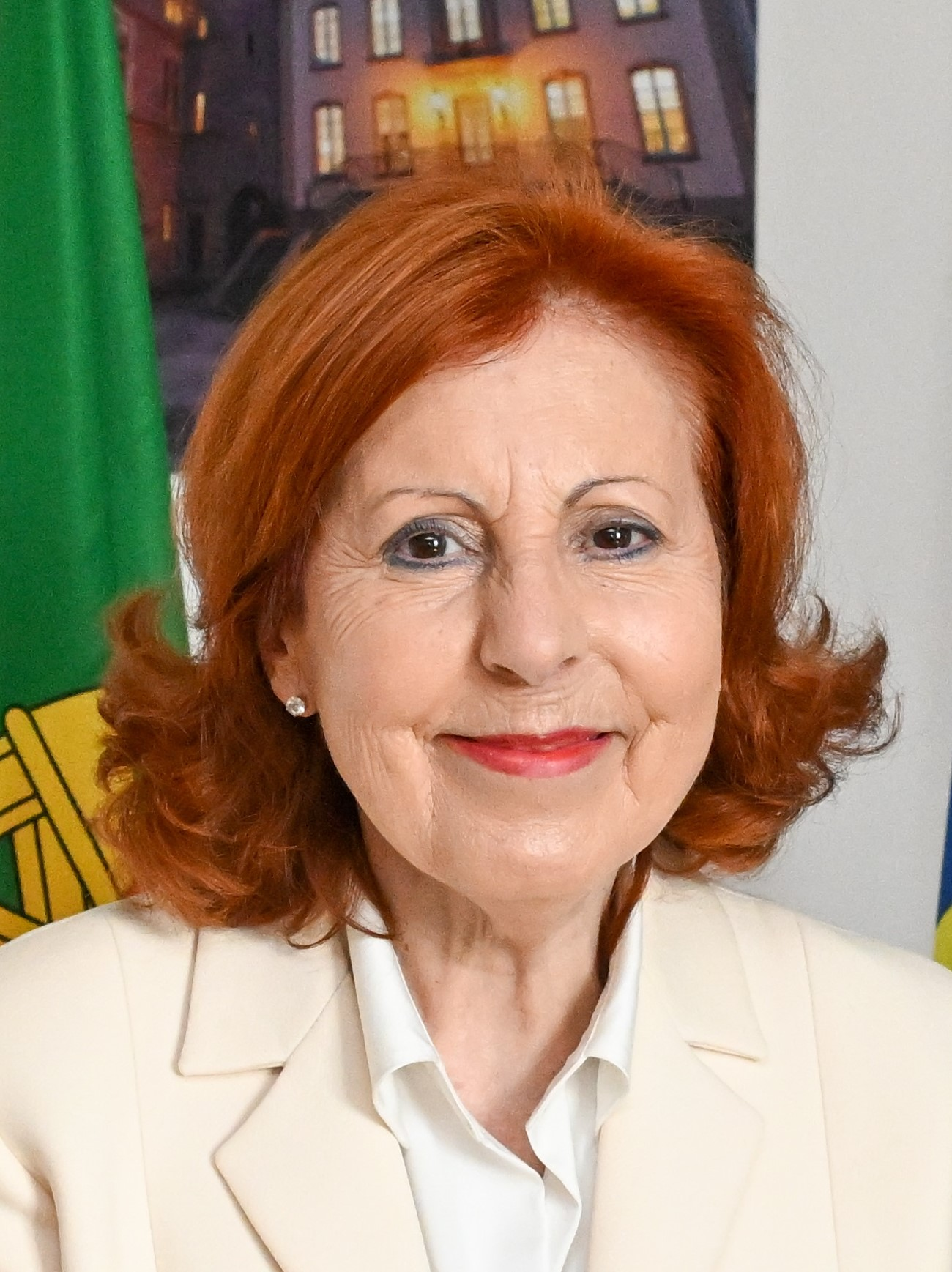
- Carvalho in 2024

Minister of the Environment and Energy
- Incumbent
- Assumed office 2 April 2024
- Prime Minister: Luís Montenegro
- Preceded by: Duarte Cordeiro

Member of the European Parliament for Portugal
- In office 2 July 2019 – 1 April 2024
- Succeeded by: Vânia Neto
- In office 14 July 2009 – 1 July 2014

Minister of Science and Higher Education
- In office 6 October 2003 – 12 March 2005
- Prime Minister: José Manuel Barroso; Pedro Santana Lopes
- Preceded by: Pedro Lynce
- Succeeded by: Mariano Gago

Personal details
- Born: 9 April 1955 (age 71) Beja, Portugal
- Party: Social Democratic Party
- Education: Instituto Superior Técnico
- Occupation: Mechanical engineer • Professor • Politician
- Awards: Order of Public Instruction (2002)

Maria da Graça Martins da Silva Carvalho (born 9 April 1955) is a Portuguese professor, engineer, and politician of the Social Democratic Party who has been serving as Minister of Environment and Energy in the government of Prime Minister Luís Montenegro since 2024.

She was a member of the European Parliament in the 2019-2024 term, having held office in the 2009-2014 legislature.

== Early life and education ==
Carvalho has a degree in Mechanical Engineering from the Instituto Superior Técnico of the University of Lisbon and a Ph.D. from the Imperial College of Science, Technology, and Medicine in the United Kingdom.

== Early career ==
Carvalho was a professor at the Instituto Superior Técnico in the Department of Mechanical Engineering, in the area of energy, environment, climate change and sustainable development.

== Career in national politics ==
From 2003 to 2005, Carvalho was a member of Portugal's government, first as Minister of Science and Higher Education and later as the Minister of Science, Innovation and Higher Education in the cabinets of successive prime ministers José Manuel Barroso (2003–2004) and Pedro Santana Lopes (2004–2005).

== Career in the European Commission ==
Carvalho acted as adviser to Durão Barroso in his capacity as President of the European Commission from 2006 to 2009.

== Member of the European Parliament, 2009–2014 ==
In 2009, Carvalho was elected Member of the European Parliament for the Social Democratic Party, a position she held until 2014.

Carvalho first served as a Member of the European Parliament from 2009 to 2014 as a representative of Portugal's Social Democratic Party (PSD). She was a member of the Parliament's Committee on Industry, Research and Energy (ITRE). In this capacity, she was also the Parliament's rapporteur on the Horizon 2020 research framework program (2014–2020). In addition to her committee assignments, she was a member of the Parliament's delegation to the ACP–EU Joint Parliamentary Assembly.

== Return to the European Commission ==
From November 2014 until December 2015, Carvalho served as an adviser to European Commissioner for Research, Innovation and Science Carlos Moedas. She later moved as a staff member to the Commission's Directorate-General for Research and Innovation, until 2019.

== Member of the European Parliament, 2019–2024 ==
In 2019, Carvalho was again elected to the European Parliament for the 9th parliamentary term (2019-2024).

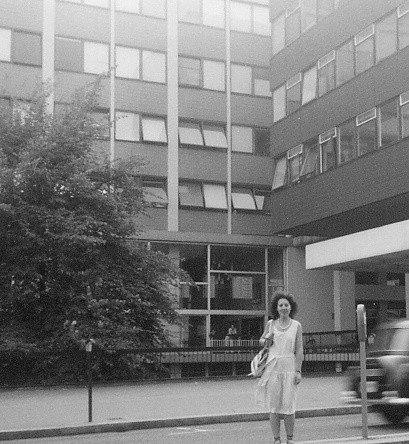
Graça Carvalho at Imperial College as a Ph.D. student (1978).

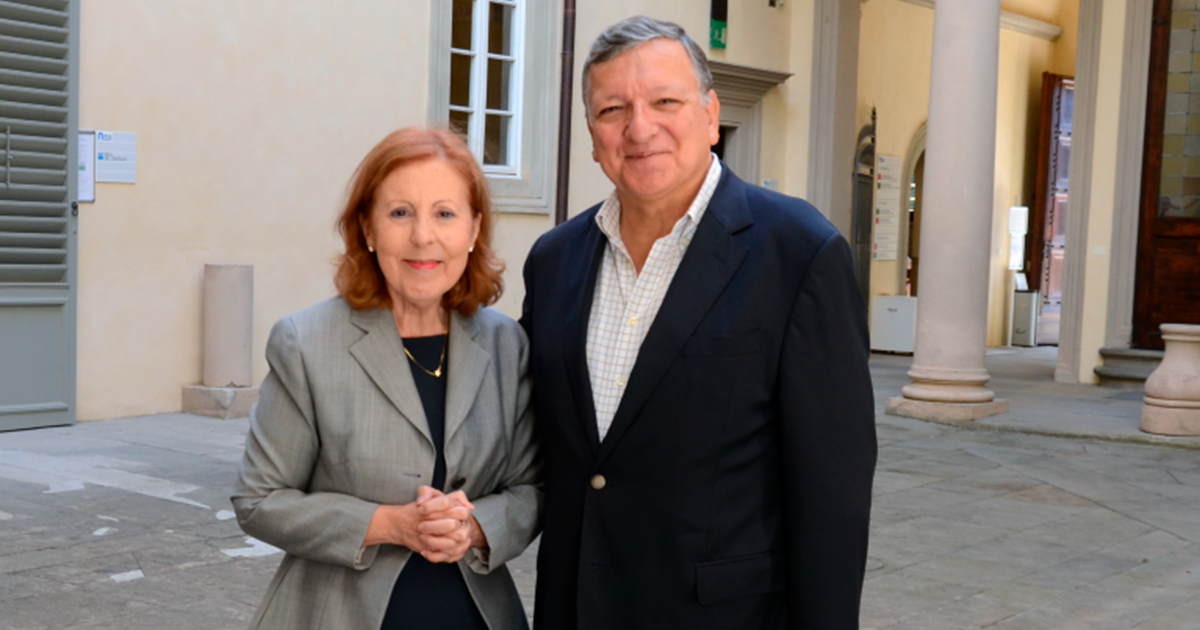
Long-term friends Carvalho and Barroso during a 2022 visit to Florence.

She integrated the European People’s Party (EPP) group. She was Vice-President of the Committee on Fisheries (PECH). She was a full member of the Industry, Research, and Energy Committee (ITRE) where she was elected Vice Coordinator for the EPP Group. She was a full member of the Committee on Women's Rights and Gender Equality (FEMM), the Special Committee on Artificial Intelligence in the Digital Age (AIDA), and the Delegation for Relations with the United States of America. She was an alternate member of the Internal Market and Consumer Protection Committee (IMCO), the Delegation for Relations with the countries of Central America, the Delegation to the Euro-Latin American Parliamentary Assembly, and the Delegation for Relations with the countries of Central Asia.

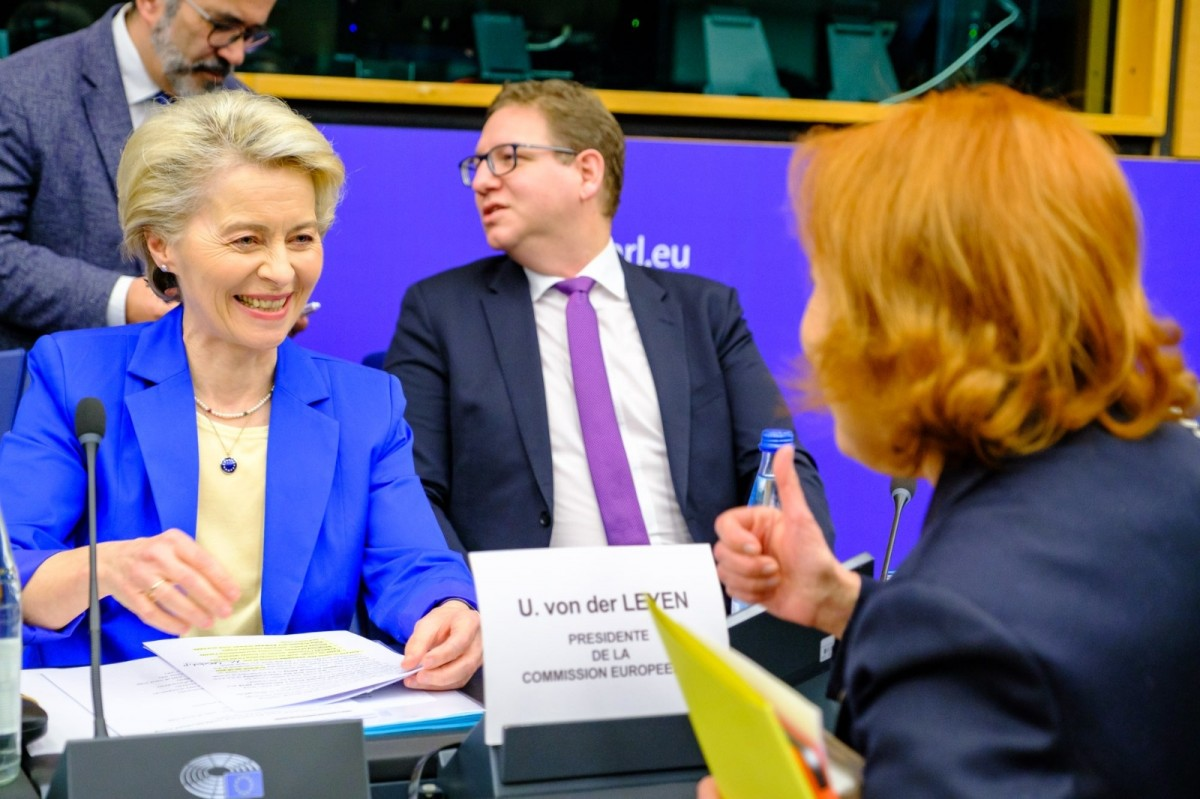
With the President of the European Commission, Ursula Von der Leyen (2023)

In the mandate in the European Parliament (2019-2024), she was rapporteur for the Strategic Programme of the European Institute of Innovation and Technology (EIT), the Single Basic Act covering nine partnerships with industry under the Horizon Europe framework program, the European Partnership for High-Performance Computing and the opinions on the New European Industrial Strategy and the Data Regulation, among others. She was the lead rapporteur for the Regulation on the Protection of the Union against manipulating the wholesale energy market (REMIT). In addition, she was the EPP negotiator of the European Electricity Market Design.

In her activity in this legislature, she had been committed to gender equality issues, having been a negotiator for the European People's Party Group regarding the directive on the participation of women on the boards of directors of listed companies (Women on Boards) and rapporteur, for the FEMM committee, of the report on the Digital Divide between Men and Women, in addition to being involved in several actions aimed at promoting gender equality in all sectors of society.

== Return to national politics ==
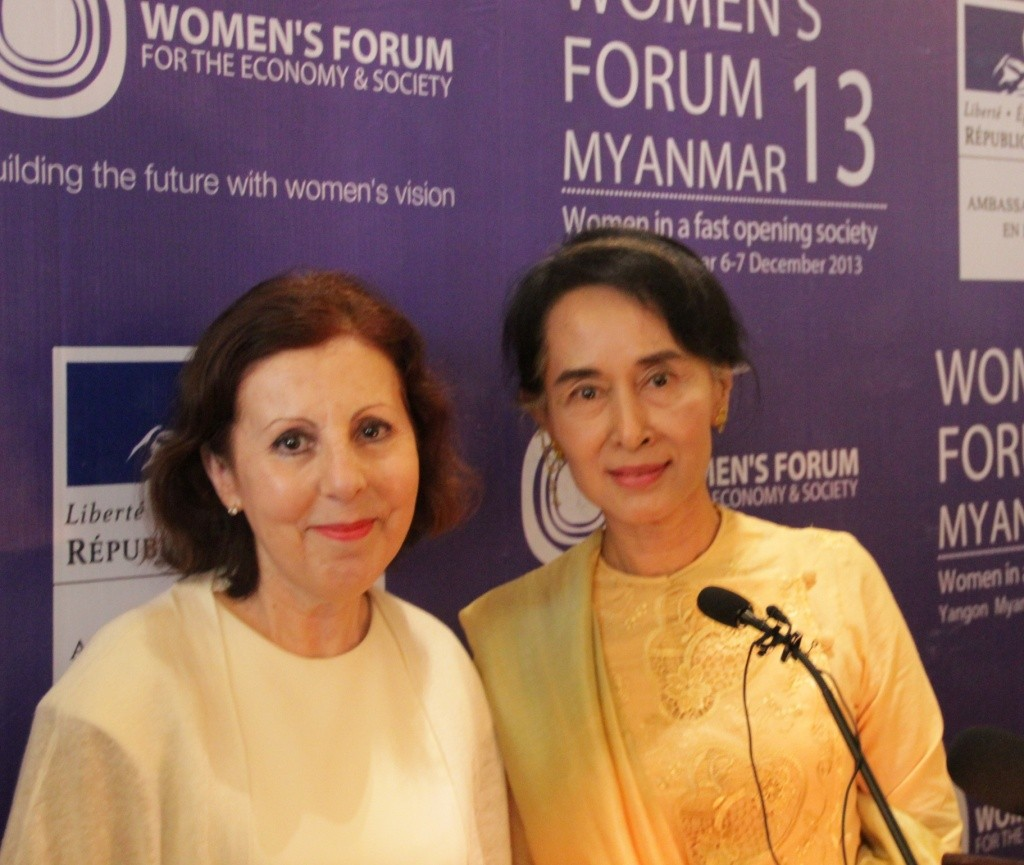
Graça Carvalho and Aung San Suu Kyi during the Women´s Forum Myanmar 2013

On April 1, 2024, Graça Carvalho resigned as an MEP to become Minister of Environment and Energy in the government of Prime Minister Luís Montenegro.

During her tenure, Graça Carvalho led the Portuguese government's response to the 2025 Iberian Peninsula blackout and later presented plans to invest up to 400 million euros to improve grid management and boost battery storage.

== Other activities ==
- European Network of European Foundations, Advisory Board (since 2023)
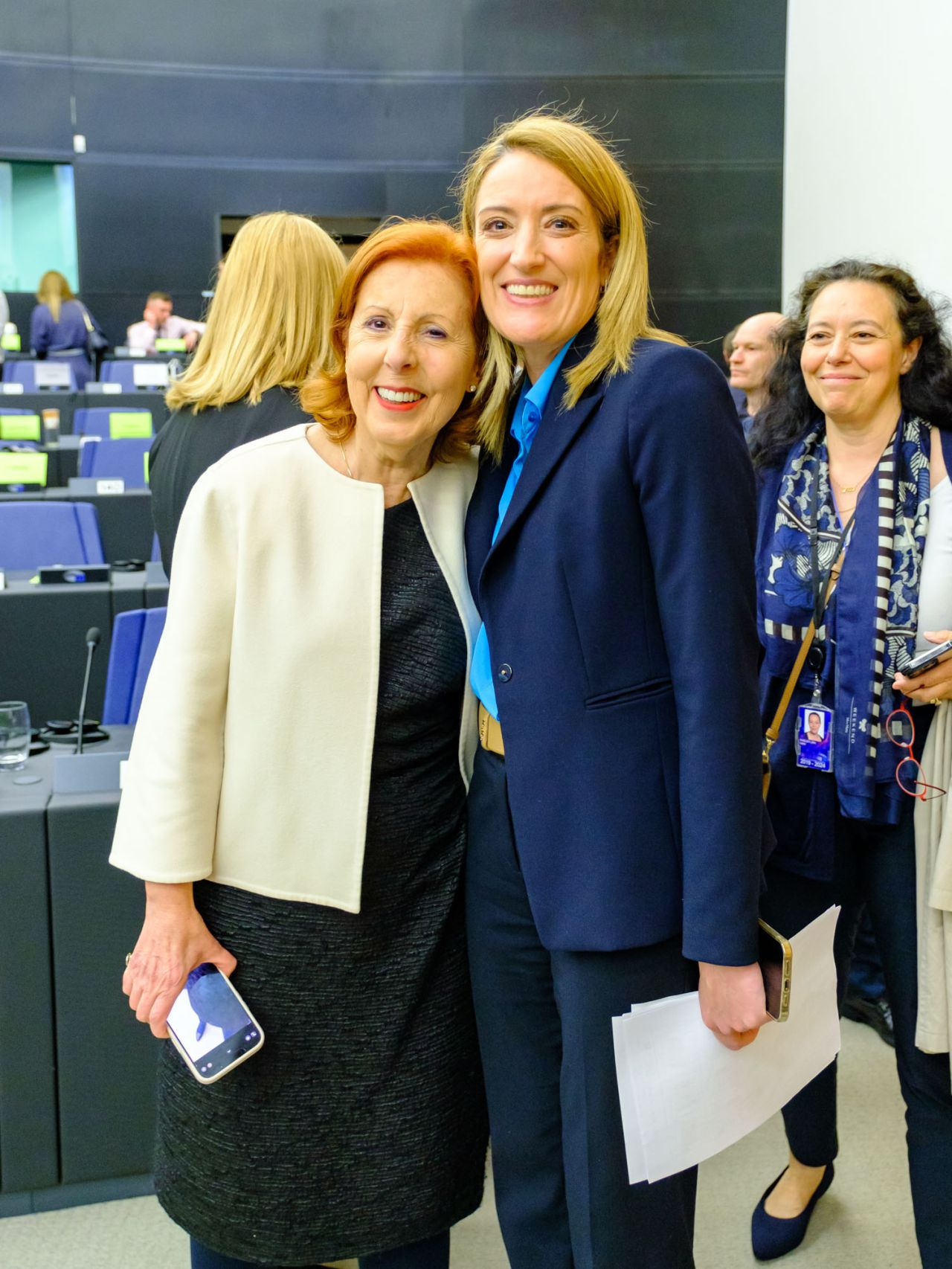
  Carvalho and Metsola in May 2023.
- Wilfried Martens Centre for European Studies, Member of the Executive Board
- Instituto Francisco Sá Carneiro, Chair of the Board of Directors (since 2020)
- Re-Imagine Europa, Member of the Task Force on Sustainable Agriculture and Innovation (since 2020)
- International Centre for Sustainable Development of Energy, Water and Environment Systems, Member of the International Scientific Committee

== Recognition ==
On 8 March 2002, on International Women's Day, Carvalho was decorated with the rank of Grand Officer of the Order of Public Instruction by Jorge Sampaio. She was made a Member of the Council of the Orders of Civil Merit on 9 June 2016.

Carvalho is also the recipient of the following awards:

- 2022 - Winner of the award for the best Member of the European Parliament in the Future of the EU and Innovation category at The Parliament Magazine's annual MEP Awards
- 2021 – Femina Prize of Honour
- 2016 – Prize Maria de Lourdes Pintasilgo, a career prize to honor outstanding women scientists and engineers
- 2016 – IUMRS International Union of Materials Research Societies Global Leadership and Service Award
- 2012 – Medal of Merit of the City of Beja
- 2011 – Prize for the best Member of the European Parliament in the area of Research and Innovation
- 2008 – CIRCE Prize, CIRCE Foundation, Saragossa
- 2005 – Portuguese Great Cross-Chancellery of the International Order of Merit of the Discoverer of Brazil
