= Željava Air Base =

Former air force base & underground tunnel facility used by former state of Yugoslavia

Željava Airport Aerodrom Željava
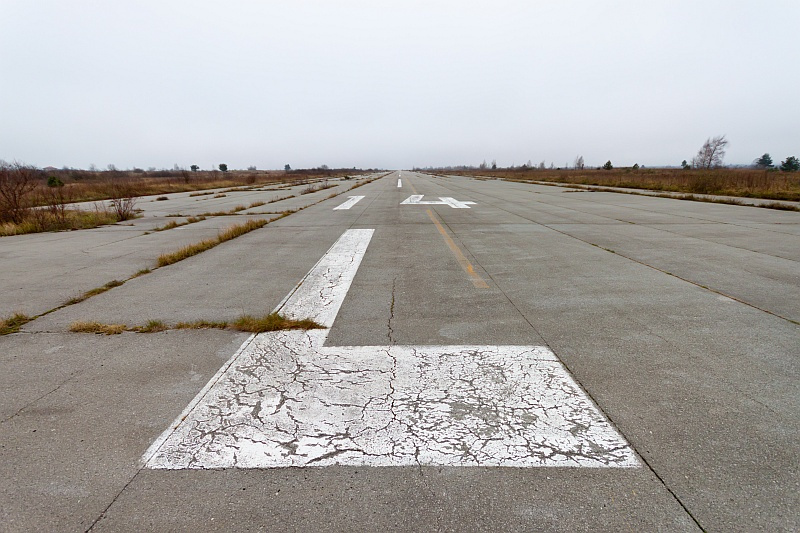
- Airport's runway
- IATA: none; ICAO: LYBI

Summary
- Airport type: Military air base
- Serves: Bihać, Bosnia and Herzegovina
- Location: Željava, Croatia
- Elevation AMSL: 1,126 ft / 343 m
- Coordinates: 44°50′11″N 15°45′29″E

Map

Runways
Direction	Length		Surface
Direction	ft	m	Surface
14L/32R (Croatia)	8,325	2,500	Asphalt
14R/32L (Croatia & BiH)	8,325	2,500	Asphalt
08R/26L (Croatia & BiH)	6,863	2,061	Asphalt
01/19 (Croatia)	9,257	2,780	Asphalt
08L/26R (BiH & Croatia)	6,826	2,050	Asphalt

Željava Air Base, situated on the border between Croatia and Bosnia and Herzegovina under the Gola Plješevica mountain, near the city of Bihać, was the largest military air base and underground hangar in the Socialist Federal Republic of Yugoslavia (SFRY), and one of the largest in Europe. The facilities are shared by the local governments of Bihać in Bosnia and Lika-Senj County of Croatia.

== History ==
The "Objekat" series of military installations can be found in secluded but strategically important areas within the former Yugoslavia, and the construction of these military bases was initialized by the SFRY's defence ministry.

During the Yugoslav Wars, most of these bases were used by the Serbs in certain operations, but due to extenuating circumstances imposed by the Croat forces, they were destroyed and later rendered useless for military use.

Nowadays, they are popular for urban exploration, although it is risky due to the possibility of anti-personnel landmines being located in unexplored areas. However, some were spared the destruction due to other circumstances where the Serbs did not control these installations. An example of some that are still in use is the D-0 Armijska Ratna Komanda nuclear bunker in Konjic, however the latter was turned into an art complex, but is still owned by the Ministry of Defence of Bosnia and Herzegovina.

The construction of the Željava or Bihać Air Base (code named "Objekat 505") was inspired by mountain hangars used by the Swedish Göta Wing (F 9), began in 1948 and was completed in 1968. During those two decades, SFRY spent approximately $6 billion on its construction, three times the combined current annual military budgets of Serbia and Croatia. It was one of the largest and most expensive military construction projects in Europe.

The airfield was documented by American CORONA satellite reconnaissance in 1968.

=== Description ===
The role of the facility was to establish, integrate and coordinate a nationwide early warning radar network in SFRY akin to NORAD in the US. The complex was designed and built to sustain a direct hit from a 20-kiloton nuclear bomb, equivalent to that dropped on Nagasaki.

==== Strategic role ====
The main advantage of the base was the strategic location of its "Celopek" intercept and surveillance radar on Mount Plješevica, at the nerve center of an advanced integrated air defence network covering the airspace and territory of Yugoslavia, and possibly further. In addition to its main roles as a protected radar installation, control centre, and secure communications facility, the airbase contained tunnels housing two full fighter squadrons, one reconnaissance squadron, and associated maintenance facilities. The units based there were the 124.LAE (Fighter Aviation Squadron) and 125.LAE, both equipped with MiG-21bis fighter aircraft, and the 352.IAE (Reconnaissance Aviation Squadron), equipped with MiG-21R reconnaissance-fighter aircraft.

The tunnels had a total length of 3.5 km (2.2 mi), and the bunker had four entrances protected by 100-ton pressurized doors, three of which were customized for use by fixed-wing aircraft. Eventually, it was hoped that the base would be re-equipped with the indigenously developed Yu Supersonik aircraft.

==== Underground "KLEK" complex ====
The underground facility was lined with semicircular concrete shields, to cushion the impact of incoming munitions. The complex included an underground water source, power generators, crew quarters, and other strategic military facilities. It also housed a mess hall that could feed 1,000 people simultaneously, along with stores of food, fuel and arms sufficient to last 30 days. Fuel was supplied by a 20 km (12 mi) underground pipe network connected to a military warehouse on Pokoj Hill near Bihać.

==== Surface ====
Above ground, the facility had five runways and within the immediate vicinity of the base, there were numerous short-range mobile tracking and targeting radars; surface-to-air missile sites equipped with; 2K12 "Kub" (NATO: SA-6) mobile surface-to-air missile interceptor systems, motorized infantry bases, two Quick Reaction Alert aircraft ready for take off at any moment, military police stations, and a hunting lodge used by civilian and military leaders on occasional leisure trips.

Access points were heavily monitored and guards were authorized to fire upon anyone attempting to enter without authorization. However, in practice only special permits were required and unauthorized visitors usually turned away.

=== Destruction ===
The airbase was used intensively in 1991, during the Yugoslav Wars. During its withdrawal, the Yugoslav People's Army destroyed the runway by filling pre-built spaces (designed for the purpose) with explosives and detonating them. To prevent any possible further use of the complex by Croatian and Bosnia-Herzegovinan forces, the Serbian Army of Krajina completed the destruction in 1992 by setting off an additional 56 tonnes of explosives. The ensuing explosion was so powerful that it shook the nearby city of Bihać. Residents of nearby villages claimed that smoke continued to rise from the tunnels for six months after the explosion. The order for the destruction was issued by Serb colonel Milan Meničanin.

=== Current status ===
Local police forces and the CPA currently use the area to train canines with actual land mines, given the extensive number of mines still in the vicinity. Because of the mines, extreme caution must be used when visiting the Željava complex. In November 2000, a Bosnian Air Force major died after setting off a PROM-2 anti-personnel mine while searching for mushrooms.

The toll of the destruction on base buildings and equipment is incalculable and caused great environmental damage. Potential reconstruction endeavors are limited by a lack of financial resources. An international border bisects the base area, and the entire area is heavily mined. The barracks in the nearby village of Ličko Petrovo Selo are operated by the Croatian Army.

Today, the base is a common waypoint for illegal migrants. A facility for asylum seekers was scheduled to open there in 2004 or 2005, but the idea was abandoned, and new plans were developed for it to become part of the Slunj military training grounds, and barracks from the nearby Udbina complex. However, this idea was dropped in line with the agreement between the countries of former Yugoslavia which bans any military facility up to 15 km (9.3 mi) inside the borders.

The Bihać Municipality launched an initiative to open a local airport using the runway.

== Gallery ==
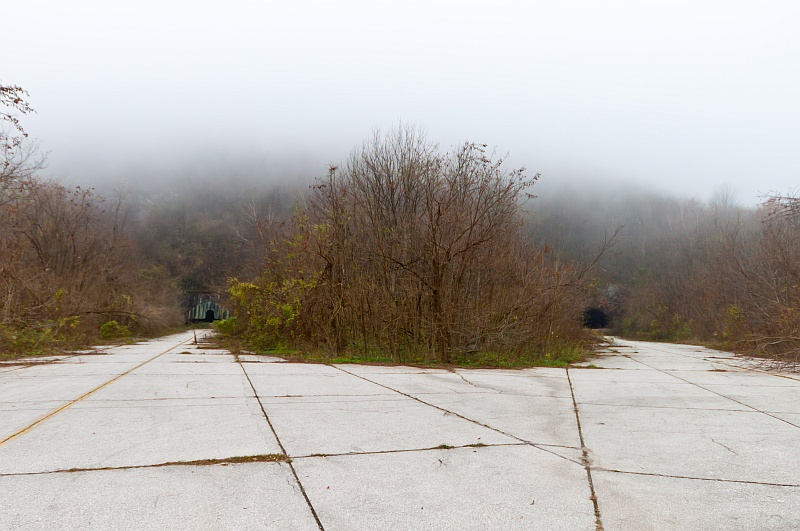
Entrances to the underground complex

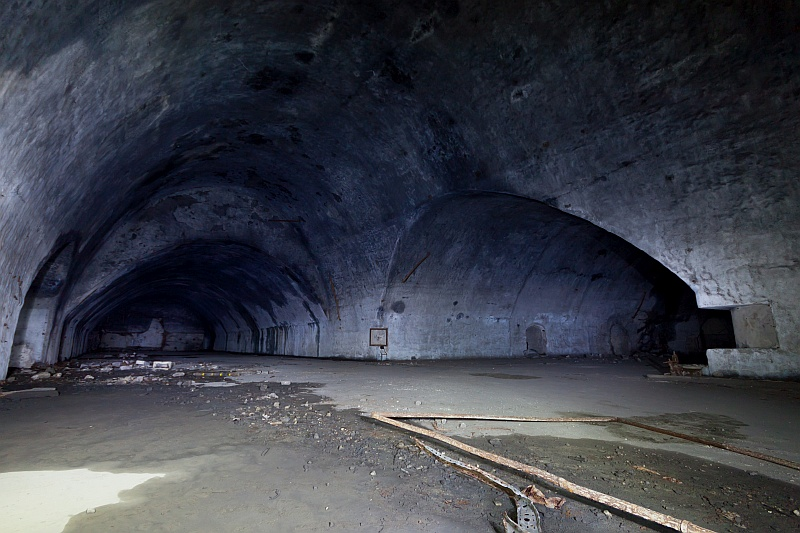
Underground mechanic room

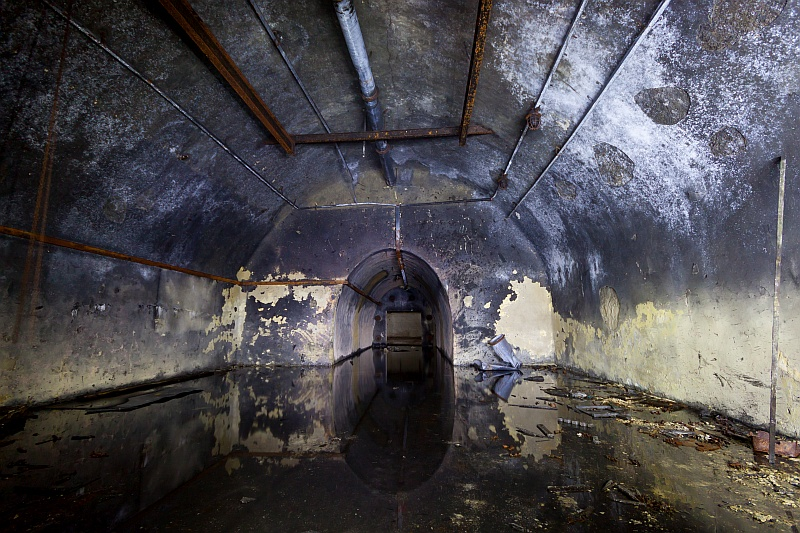
Bomb and missile storage

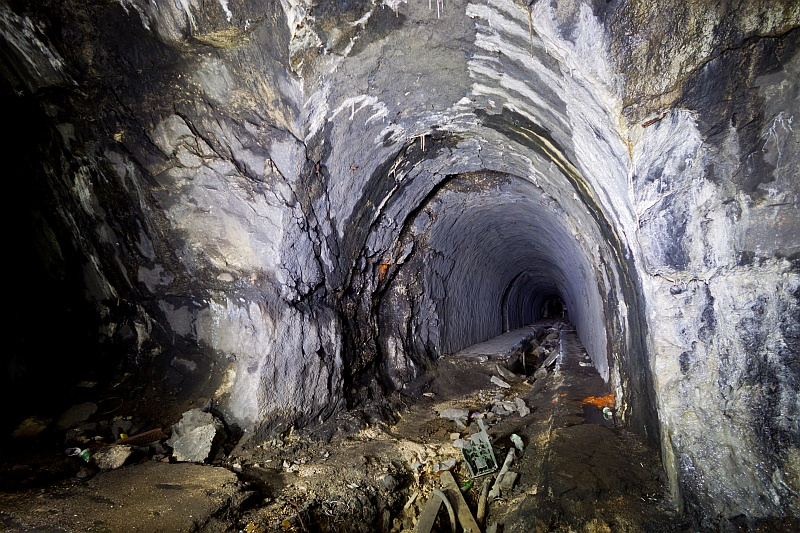
Hallway

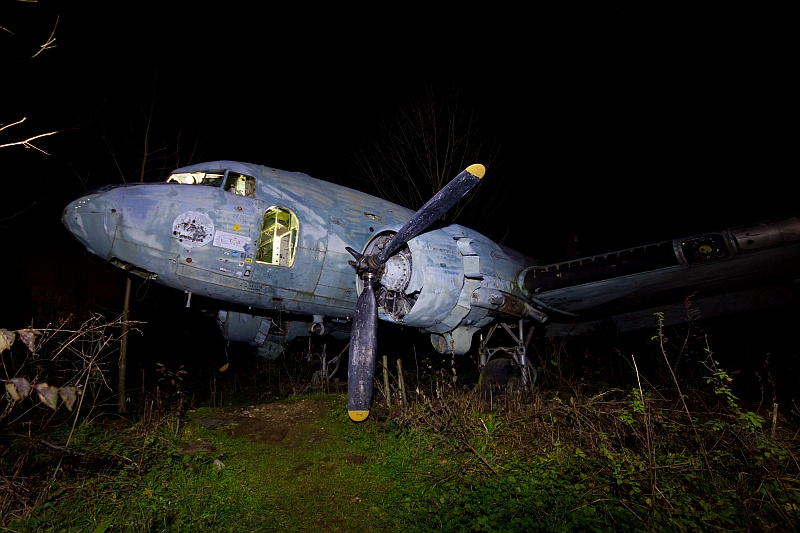
Abandoned Douglas C-47

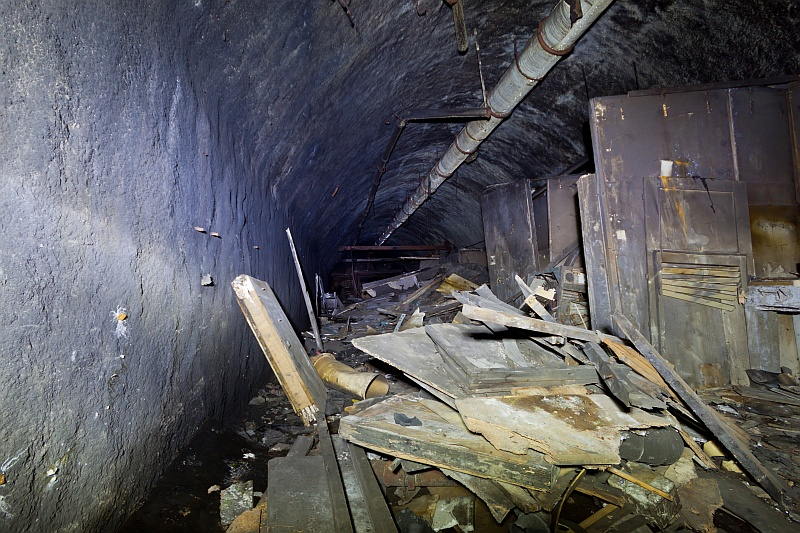
Destroyed reconnaissance photo laboratory

== See also ==
- Armijska Ratna Komanda D-0
- Slatina Air Base
- Yugoslav Air Force
