= Armijska Ratna Komanda D-0 =

Nuclear bunker in Konjic, Bosnia and Herzegovina

ARK D-0: Armijska Ratna Komanda
- Atomska Ratna Komanda
- Konjic; Near Konjic in Bosnia and Herzegovina
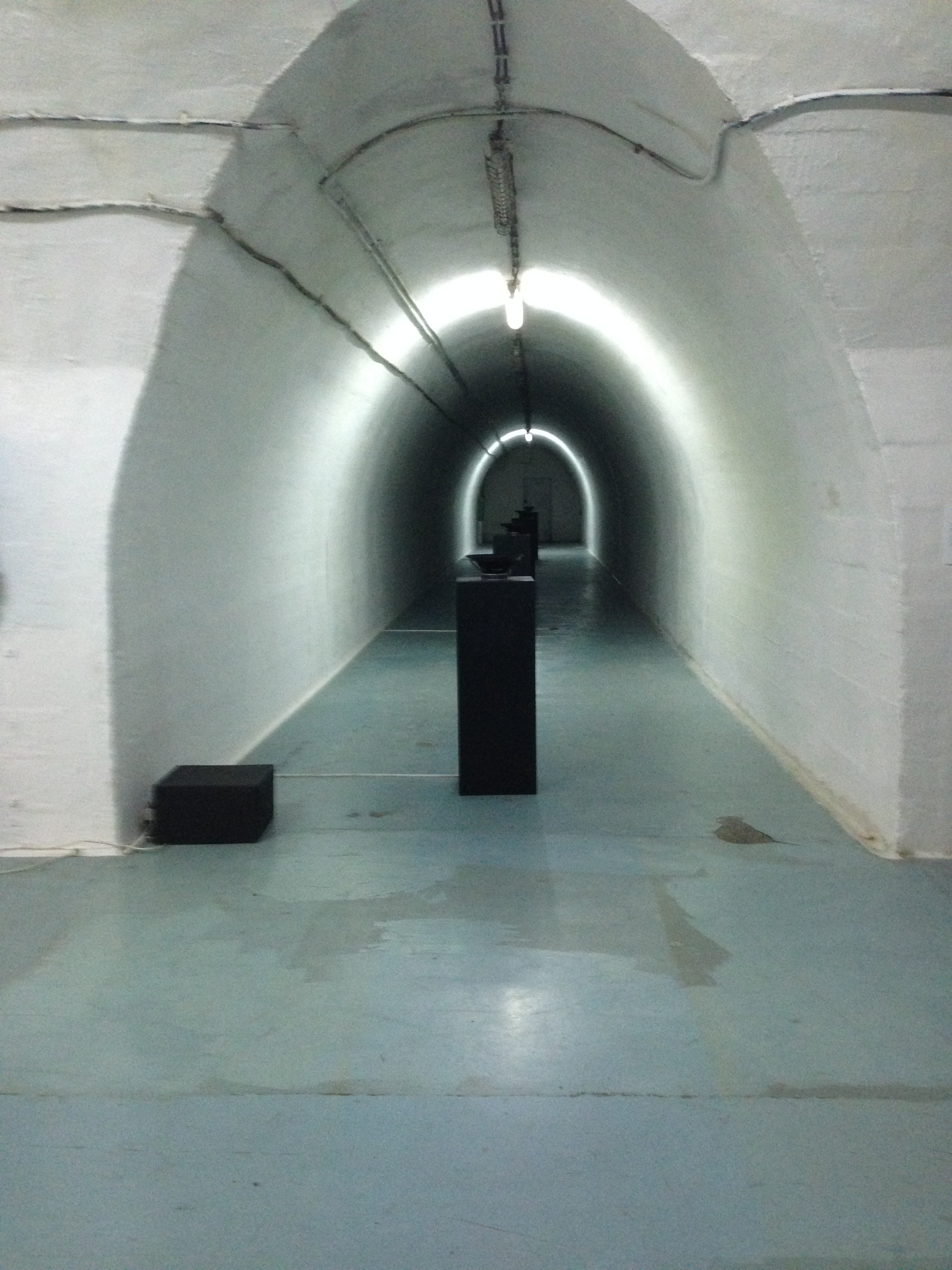
- Main corridor inside ARK D-0, showcasing the extensive tunnel network designed for long-term survival.

Site information
- Type: Cold War nuclear bunker / Command Center
- Code: Istanbul (Official construction code name)
- Owner: Bosnia and Herzegovina
- Controlled by: Ministry of Defence of BiH
- Open to the public: Yes (Guided tours only)
- Condition: Operational / Preserved (Museum / Contemporary Art Biennial)
- Construction Cost: ~ $4.6 billion (estimated value in 1979 currency)

Location
- Location within Bosnia and Herzegovina
- Coordinates: 43°38′03″N 17°59′42″E
- Area: 6,854 m^{2} (73,780 sq ft)

Site history
- Built: 1953–1979
- Built for: Josip Broz Tito and the General Staff of JNA
- Built by: Socialist Federal Republic of Yugoslavia
- In use: 1979–1992 (active military secret) 2011–present (Contemporary Art Museum & Tourist Attraction)
- Materials: Reinforced concrete, steel, and natural rock shielding
- Fate: Preserved as a museum
- Battles/wars: Cold War (Strategic deterrent) Bosnian War (Preserved from destruction)
- Events: D-0 ARK Underground Biennial of Contemporary Art

Garrison information
- Garrison: Designed for 350 personnel
- Designations: National Monument of Bosnia and Herzegovina

The Armijska Ratna Komanda D-0 (full civil designation in Serbo-Croatian: Vojni objekat Armijska Ratna Komanda ARK D-0, Армијска Ратна Команда, lit. 'Army War Command'), also known as the Ark, ARK/D-0, Atomska Ratna Komanda, and nicknamed Tito's bunker, is a Cold War-era nuclear bunker and military command centre located near the town of Konjic in Bosnia and Herzegovina. Built to protect Yugoslav President Josip Broz Tito and up to 350 members of his inner circle in the event of an atomic conflict, the structure is made up of residential areas, conference rooms, offices, strategic planning rooms, and other areas. The bunker remained a state secret until after the breakup of Yugoslavia in the 1990s.

== History ==
In 1953, as the Cold War was heating up, President Tito directed the Yugoslav People's Army (JNA) to begin work on the ARK bunker. In the event of nuclear war, the complex was designed to function as a centre of military operations and a shelter for both the Supreme Command staff and Tito, along with his family and close associates. Its construction and existence were among the most closely guarded Yugoslav military secrets of the time and remained so until the 1990s, when the ARK was revealed to the public.

In 1979, when work was completed after 26 years and US$4.6 billion in construction costs (equal to $20.4 billion in today's currency), the facility was handed over to a JNA detachment of 16 military personnel (nine Serbs, four Bosniaks, and three Croats) tasked with maintaining the structure, should the need to use it ever arise.

After Tito's death in 1980, the complex was mothballed but kept ready in case of war. In March 1992, during the breakup of Yugoslavia, the JNA general Milutin Kukanjac ordered its demolition to deny it to the government of Bosnia and Herzegovina. As with Željava Air Base, it was prepped for destruction and rigged with explosives, but two military personnel sabotaged the plan by breaking the wires during evacuation. The military detachment later surrendered the structure to the Bosnian government. It was subsequently used as a supply base by the Republic of Bosnia and Herzegovina during the Bosnian War, as medical supplies and equipment were in short supply.

== Construction ==
Built between 1953 and 1979 inside Zlatar Hill at the southern foothills of Bjelašnica Mountain, the ARK is the largest nuclear shelter, and one of the largest underground facilities, ever built in the former Yugoslavia. For over a decade after its completion, it was the most secret military installation in the country. All construction workers were carefully vetted, signing a confidentiality contract, and all staff members held the highest security clearance.

Visible from the outside of the complex are three nondescript houses, not marked on any map, in an isolated natural setting located along the Neretva River. For nearly 50 years, the houses concealed entrances to the third largest military facility in Yugoslavia (after the underground Željava Air Base near Bihać and the Lora naval facility in Split, Croatia). The houses consist of a control residence, a building containing secure communication links, and a facility for technical support personnel. Along a corridor located in the first house, three 1.2-meter-thick metal doors protect a tunnel leading to the heart of the shelter, which is 280 meters deep and 202 meters long.

The underground horseshoe-shaped structure, built to withstand a 20-kiloton nuclear blast, is divided into 12 interconnected blocks, the most important being Blocks 6 (communication), 8 (Tito's block), 9 (air filtration), 10 (fuel storage), and 11 (water storage). Designed to protect and accommodate up to 350 people for up to six months, the bunker covers an area of 6,854 m^{2} and contains over 100 rooms, including dormitories, two large conference rooms, five operation centres that contained direct phone links to the Presidency, two kitchens, five large bathrooms, a cryptography centre, cable television access, and a fully equipped hospital operating room. President Tito's residence consists of five rooms: one for his secretary and party leaders, Tito's office, his bedroom, from which one could enter the room of Yugoslav First Lady Jovanka Broz, and a relaxation room.

Within the structure are 21 large systems and maintenance rooms with containers capable of holding 50 tons of oil, climate control systems, 170-cubic-meter water tanks, and running water drawn from natural wells located within the mountain. Each system was equipped with a backup in case the primary failed. The temperature in the bunker is between 21 and 23 degrees Celsius, with humidity between 60% and 70%, representing near-optimal subterranean living conditions. The complex is lit by approximately 6,000 neon bulbs.

== Present ==
Today the facility is under the authority of the Bosnian Ministry of Defense and is managed by the country's military, guarded by a five-soldier detachment, and preserved intact with all its symbols of the social, economic, political and ideological system of Socialist Yugoslavia. During the wars of the 1990s, many monuments in the former Yugoslavia were destroyed, particularly those in Bosnia and Herzegovina. ARK is, therefore, a unique exhibition space, a nontraditional artistic setting from both a psychological and intellectual point of view.

== ARK D-0 Underground Contemporary Art Biennial Project ==
Tito's bunker now serves as a meeting point for artists from across the region, Europe, and the world. The Project Biennial of Contemporary Art aims to transform a site still officially under military control into a prestigious regional cultural institution at the forefront of emerging artistic trends. The project seeks to preserve cultural heritage and a historic structure as well as to create artistic value and reestablish broken connections between artists and creative people in the region.

The Council of Europe in 2011 named the project a Cultural Event of Europe; it enjoys strong UNESCO support. A first edition of the Biennial of Contemporary Art in 2011 brought together 44 artists from 18 countries and over 15,000 visitors. Subsequent editions took place every other year until the final fifth edition in 2019. Over fifty works of art remained on-site as permanent exhibits. The project received financial support from Croatia, Bosnia and Herzegovina, Montenegro, Serbia, and Turkey.

== Gallery ==
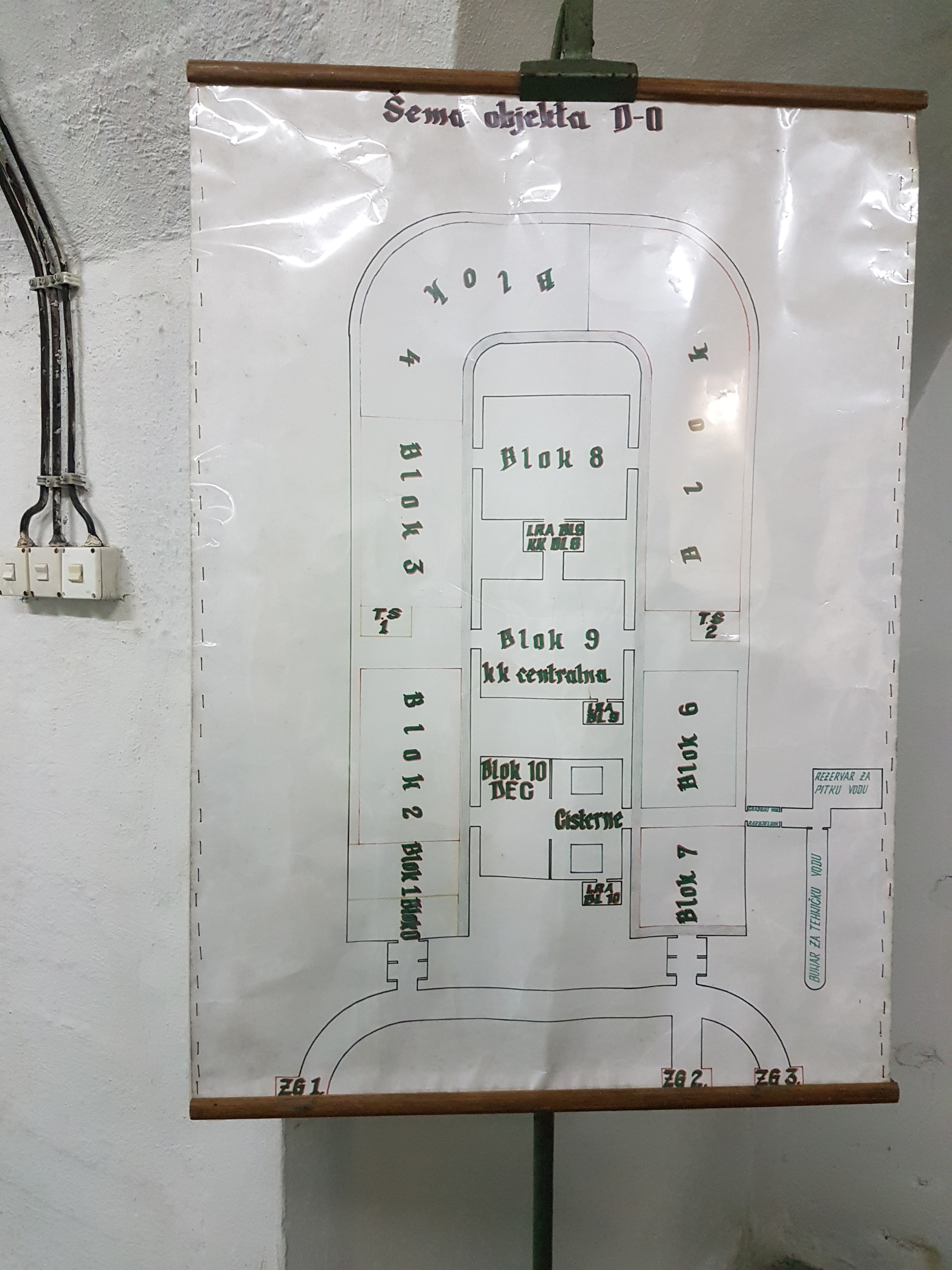
Schematic view of ARK in Konjic

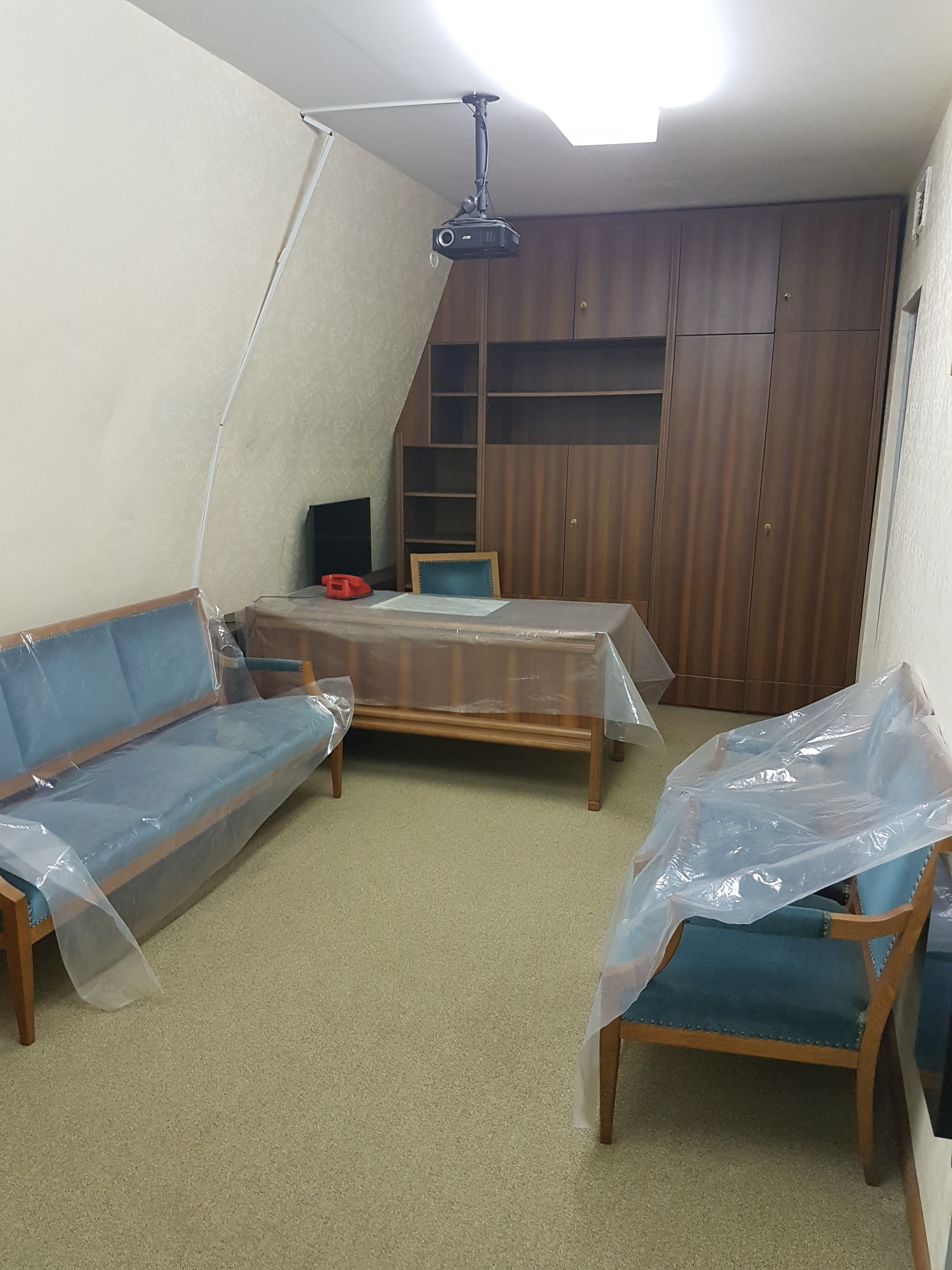
Room inside Tito's bunker near Konjic

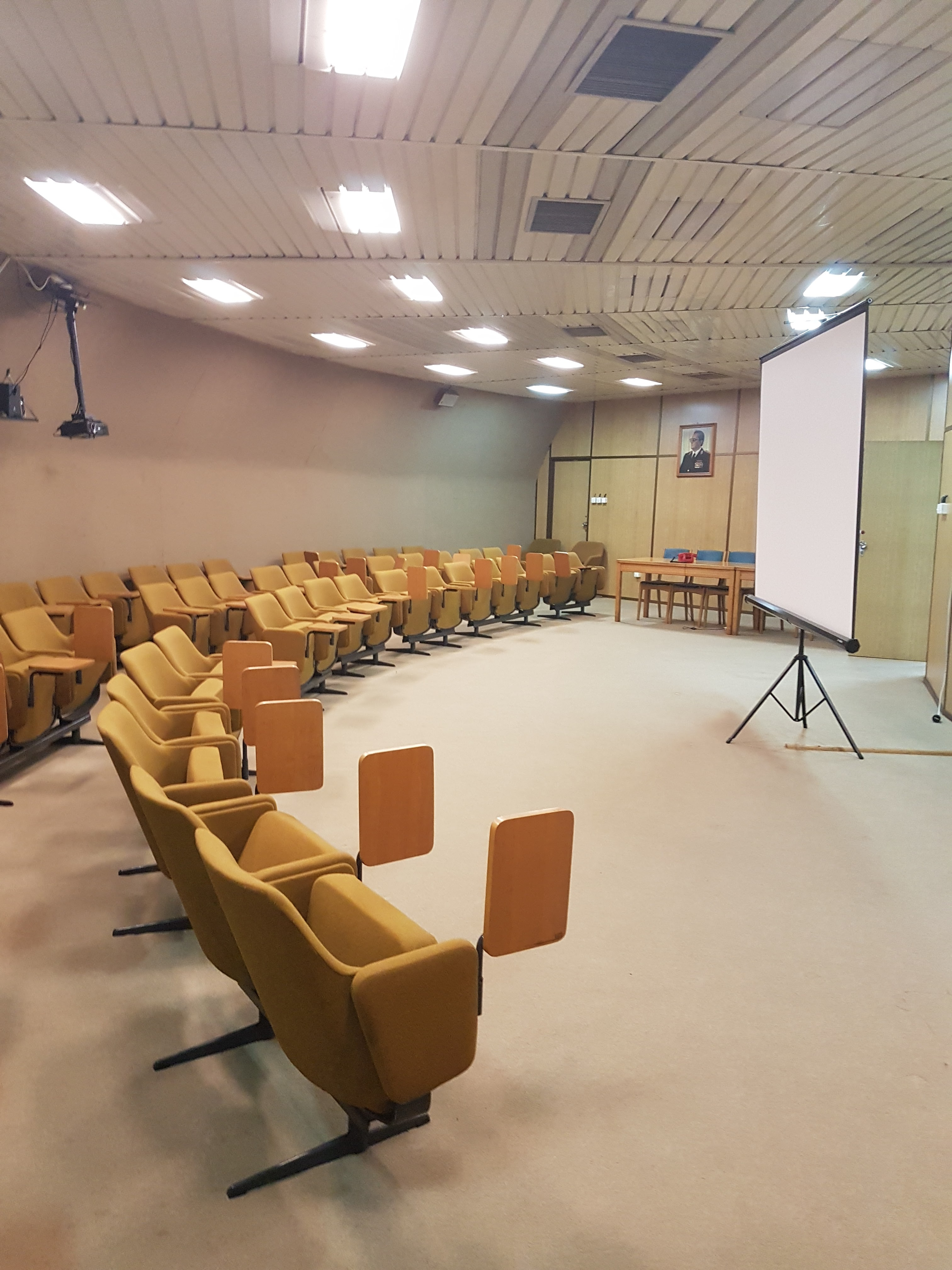
Conference room in Tito's bunker near Konjic

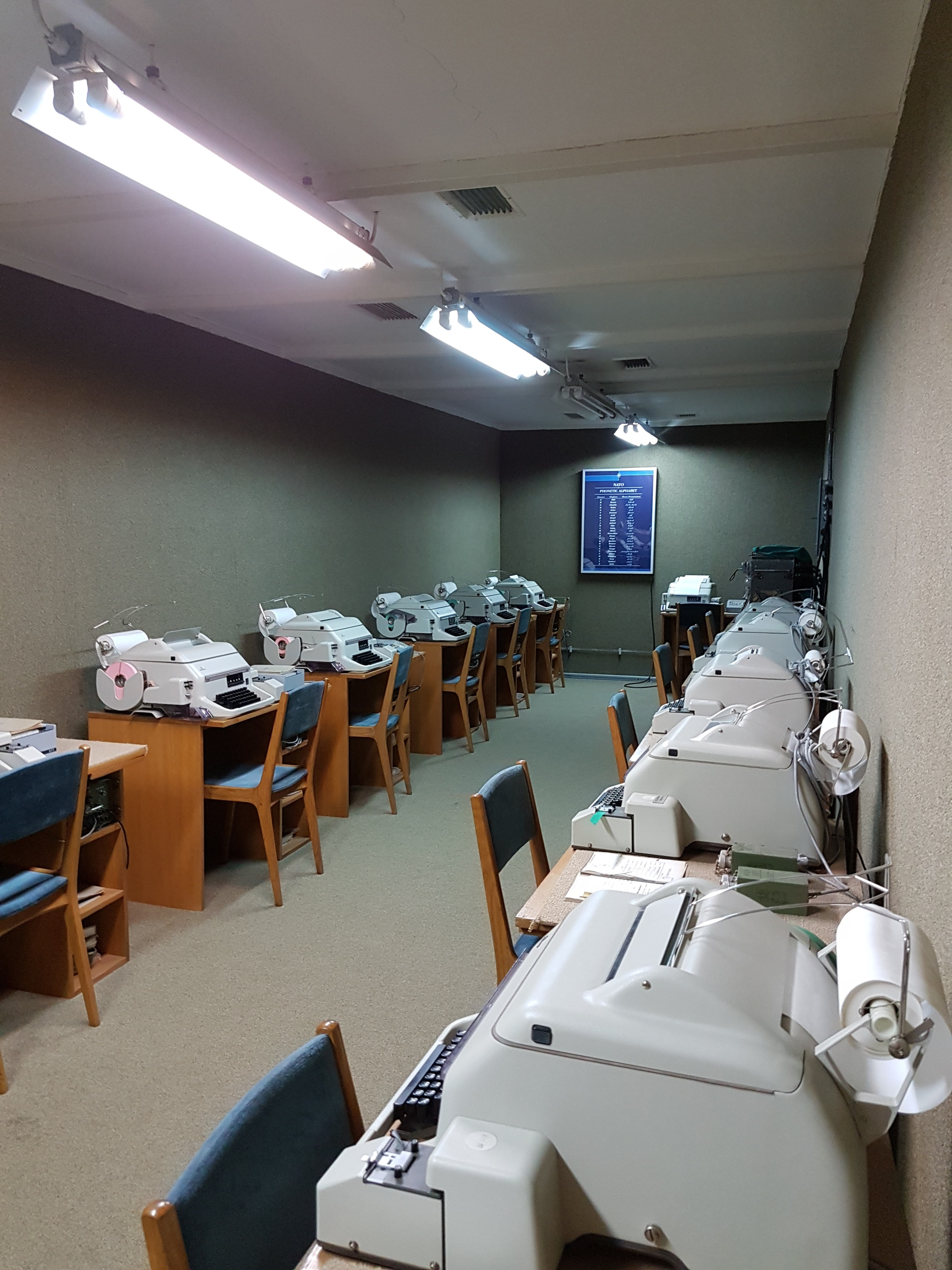
Communication centre in ARK bunker near Konjic, Bosnia and Herzegovina

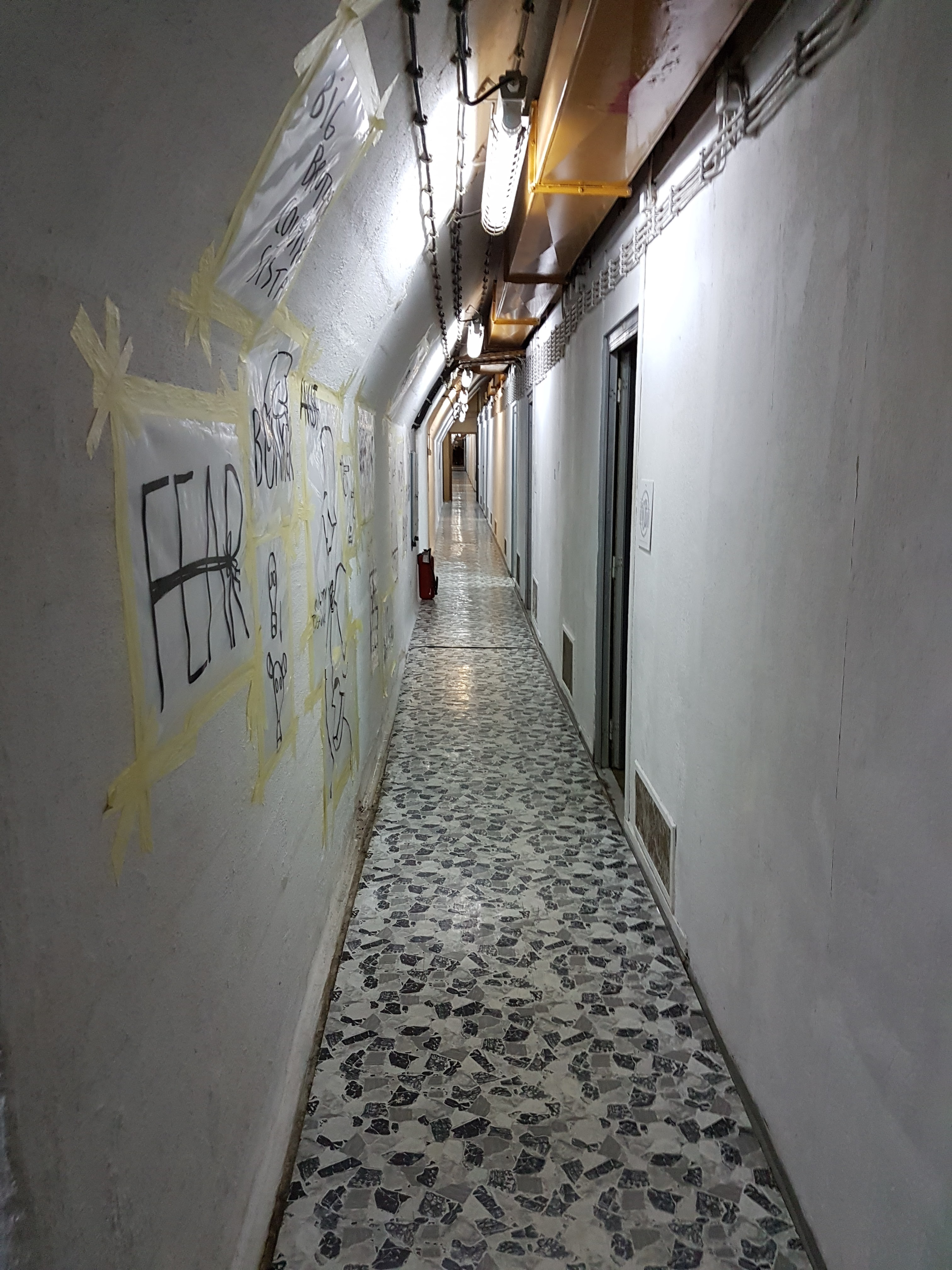
Hallway inside ARK bunker near Konjic, Bosnia and Herzegovina

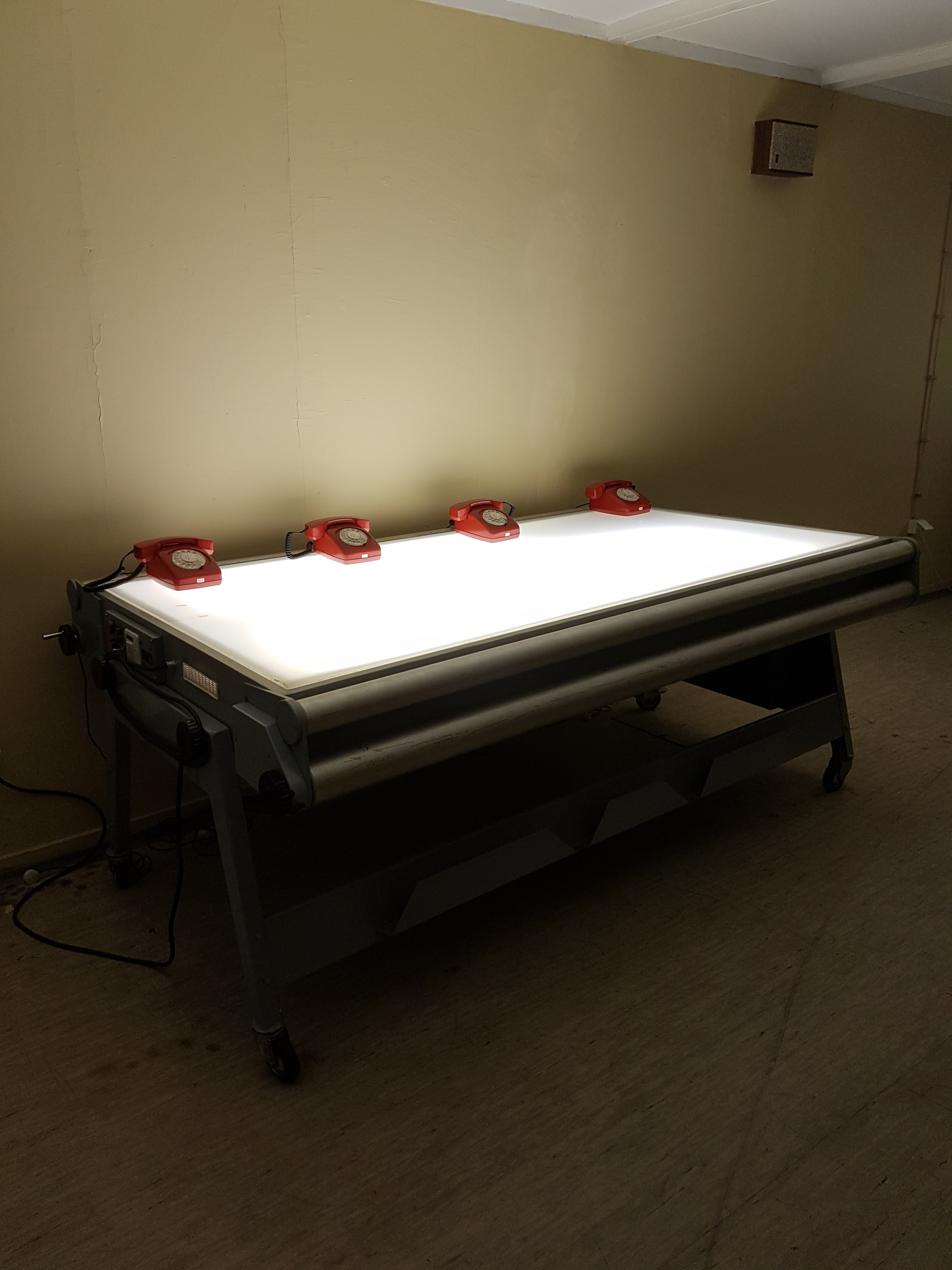
Light table and red phones inside command room in ARK bunker near Konjic

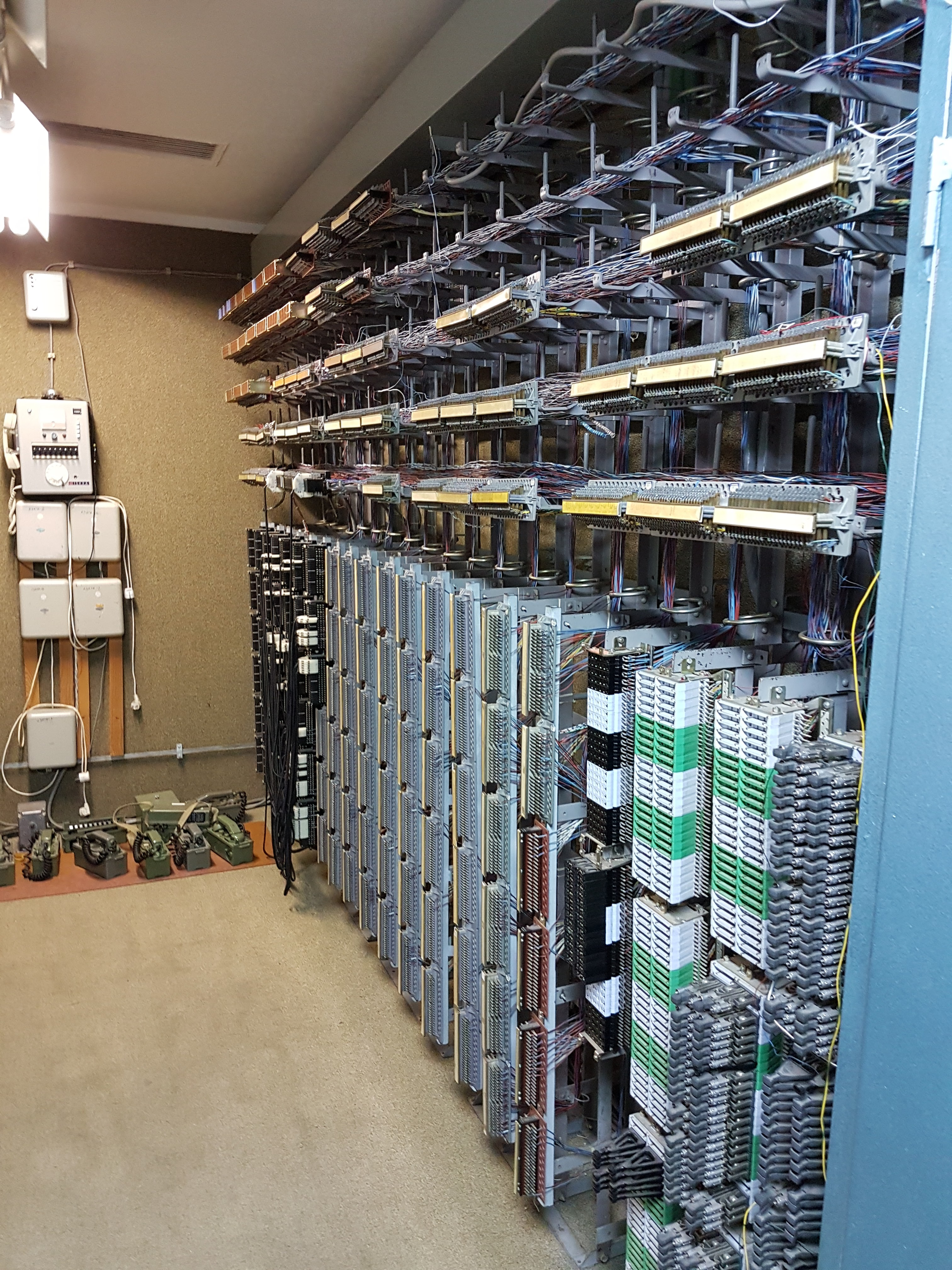
Central telecommunications office inside Tito's bunker near Konjic, Bosnia and Herzegovina

External image
- Secret bunker

== See also ==
- Željava Air Base
- Objekat Veliki Žep
- Yugoslavia and weapons of mass destruction
- North American Aerospace Defense Command
