= Scartezzini =

Scartezzini is an Italian surname. Notable people with the surname include:

- Jean-Louis Scartezzini (born 1957), Swiss building physicist
- Mariano Scartezzini (born 1954), Italian long-distance runner
- Michele Scartezzini (born 1992), Italian cyclist
