= World Renewable Energy Network =

WREN is a major non-profit organization registered in the United Kingdom with charitable status and affiliated to UNESCO, the Deputy Director General of which is its honorary President. It has a Governing Council, an executive committee and a Director General. It maintains links with many United Nations, governmental and non-governmental organisations.

== Overview ==
Established in 1992 during the second World Renewable Energy Congress in Reading, UK, WREN supports and enhances the utilisation and implementation of renewable energy sources that are both environmentally safe and economically sustainable. This is done through a worldwide network of agencies, laboratories, institutions, companies and individuals, all working together towards the international diffusion of renewable energy technologies and applications. Representing most countries in the world, it aims to promote the communication and technical education of scientists, engineers, technicians and managers in this field and to address itself to the energy needs of both developing and developed countries.

Over two billion dollars have now been allocated to projects dealing with renewable energy and the environment by the World Solar Summit and World Solar Decade along with the World Bank.

== Activities ==
The global activities of the World Renewable Energy Congress / Network encompass:

- Newsletter
- Regional meetings
- Scientific publications
- Targeted books and annual magazine
- Workshops on renewable energy topics
- Journal publication "Renewable Energy"
- Competitions and awards promoting renewable energy
- International congresses (World Renewable Energy Congress, WREC)

=== Mission statement ===
With the accelerated approach of the global climate-change point-of-no-return the need to address the pivotal role of renewable energy in the formation of coping strategies, rather than prevention, is more crucial than ever. Sustainability, green buildings, and the development of the large-scale renewable energy industry must be at the top of all development, economic, financial and political agendas. The time for action has arrived. Prevention and questioning how and why we face this great challenge is a luxury we can no longer indulge. We welcome the establishment of the long overdue International Renewable Energy Agency which we hope will work side-by-side with similar intergovernmental agencies striving for the adoption of renewable energies.

== Major events ==
The major event organised by WREC/WREN is the biennial congress, normally held during the summer of every even year. The congresses are mostly run and organised by the WREC headquarters which are in Brighton, UK. All members of WREC/WREN are entitled to bid to host the Congress. The WREC/WREN Council meets and decides the location based on: availability of local funding and sponsorship; ease of travel to the location; extent of host government and institutional support; benefits to the local country. All local organisation and services must be provided by the host country.

The first three congresses were held in the UK (Reading), followed by a move to Denver (United States) and then to Florence (Italy). In the year 2000 the congress returned to the UK (Brighton) with every effort being made to ensure that this event enhanced the recognition of Renewable Energies in the new millennium. In 2002 the congress took place in Cologne (Germany) and 2004 once more in Denver (USA). In 2006 the congress was held in Florence (Italy) and in 2008 in Glasgow (UK). The next congresses will be in Abu Dhabi (UAE) in 2010 and in Denver (USA) in 2012 respectively.

The following table shows the statistics for the previous WREC conferences:

No	Date	No of Countries Contributing	Place of Congress	No of Attendants
I	Sept 1990	79	Reading UK	650
II	Sept 1992	86	Reading UK	580
III	Sept 1994	96	Reading UK	620
IV	June 1996	107	Denver USA	768
V	Sept 1998	110	Florence ITALY	765
VI	July 2000	112	Brighton UK	801
VII	July 2002	117	Cologne GERMANY	879
VIII	Sept 2004	97	Denver USA	1127
IX	Aug 2006	107	Florence ITALY	915
X	July 2008	88	Glasgow UK	760

== Purpose of WREC ==
At no time in modern history has energy played a more crucial role in the development and well-being of nations than at present. The source and nature of energy, the security of supply and the equity of distribution, the environmental impact of its supply and utilization, are all crucial matters to be addressed by suppliers, consumers, governments, industry, academia, and financial institutions.

The World Renewable Energy Congress (WREC), a major recognised forum for networking between these sectors, addresses these issues through regular meetings and exhibitions, bringing together representatives of all those involved in the supply, distribution, consumption and development of energy sources which are benign, sustainable, accessible and economically viable. WREC enables policy makers, researchers, manufacturers, economists, financiers, sociologists, environmentalists and others to present their views in Plenary and Technical Sessions and to participate in discussions, both formal and informal, thus facilitating the transfer of knowledge between nations, institutions, disciplines and individuals.

== WREC Renewable Energy Awards ==
The WREC Renewable Energy Awards were established in 1998, during the 5th edition of the WREC Congress in Florence as a way to recognize outstanding achievement and vision in the global renewable energy sector.

The WREC Renewable Energy Awards aim at highlighting the worldwide best-implemented policies, projects and research in the following topics:

- Fuel Cells and Hydrogen
- Low Energy Architecture
- Solar Energy
- Wind Technology
- Biomass
- Sustainable Transport
- Green Energy Business

== WREC/WREN Aims and Objectives ==
WREN is a non-profit UK company (reg. no. 1874667) limited by guarantee and not having a share capital, incorporated in 1990 as a registered charity (No. 1009879), with registered offices in England. The aims and objectives of WREC/WREN are as follows:

1. Ensuring renewable energy takes its proper place in the sustainable supply and use of energy for greatest benefit of all, taking due account of research requirements, energy efficiency, conservation, and cost criteria.
2. Assisting and promoting the real local, regional and global environmental benefits of renewable energy.
3. Promoting the innovation, diffusion and efficient application of economic renewable energy technologies.
4. Enhancing energy supply security without damage to the environment.
5. Widening energy availability, especially in developing countries and rural areas.
6. Promoting business opportunities for renewable energy projects and their successful implementation.
7. Ensuring the financing of, and institutional support for, economic renewable energy projects.
8. Encouraging improved information and education on renewable energy.
9. Involving young people in information and education on renewable energy with a parallel, closely #integrated programme.
10. Providing a technical exhibition where manufacturers and others can display their products and services.
11. Strengthen and expand the effectiveness of Networking among nations, institutions, agencies, organizations and individuals in research, application, commercialization and education of renewable energy technology.
12. Providing a forum within which participants voice their achievement and thought at various parts of the world.
