= Decoupling Natural Resource Use and Environmental Impacts from Economic Growth report =

- Type: Independent scientific assessment
- Publication: May 2011, International Resource Panel
- Website: www.resourcepanel.org

The report Decoupling Natural Resource Use and Environmental Impacts from Economic Growth is one of a series of reports researched and published by the International Resource Panel (IRP) of the United Nations Environment Programme. The IRP provides independent scientific assessments and expert advice on a variety of areas, including:

- The volume of selected raw material reserves and how efficiently these resources are being used
- The lifecycle-long environmental impacts of products and services created and consumed around the globe
- Options to meet human and economic needs with fewer or cleaner resources.

== About the report ==
The concept of decoupling is not about stopping economic growth, but rather doing more with less. In the report's preface, the panel explained that the "conceptual framework for decoupling and understanding of the instrumentalities for achieving it is still in an infant stage" and that this "first report is simply an attempt to scope the challenges."

The report considered the amount of resources currently being consumed by humanity and analysed how that would likely increase with population growth and future economic development. Its scenarios showed that by 2050 humans could use triple the amount of minerals, ores, fossil fuels and biomass annually – 140 billion tonnes per year – unless the rate of resource consumption could be decoupled from that of economic growth. Developed country citizens currently consume as much as 25 tonnes of those four key resources each year, while the average person in India consumes four tonnes annually. Another billion middle-class are set to emerge as developing countries rapidly become industrialised.

There is evidence that decoupling is already underway; world gross domestic product grew by a factor of 23 in the 20th century, while resource use rose by a factor of eight. However, this will not be enough to avoid meeting resource scarcity and severe environmental limits.

Resource use may ultimately need to fall to between five and six tonnes per person annually. Recycling, re-use and greater efficiency can all help achieve decoupling.

It showed that decoupling might be a good strategy for economic growth in developing countries to avoid becoming resource-intensive economies in the future.

== See also ==
- Ecological modernization
