= Vinča Nuclear Institute =

Nuclear physics research organization in Serbia

Coordinates: 44.7582923°N 20.5962003°E

Vinča Institute of Nuclear Sciences
- Official logo
- Native name: Институт Винча
- Founded: 1948; 78 years ago
- Headquarters: Vinča, Serbia
- Key people: Slavko Dimović (Acting Director)
- Website: www.vin.bg.ac.rs/en/

The Vinča Institute of Nuclear Sciences is a research institution near Belgrade, Serbia. Since its founding, the Institute has also conducted research in the fields of physics, chemistry, and biology. The scholarly institute is part of the University of Belgrade.

== History ==
Construction of the site began in 1947 (as part of Yugoslavia's nuclear program), however the institute was only officially established in January 1948. Several different research groups started in the 1950s, and two research reactors were built.

The institute operates two research reactors; RA and RB. The research reactors were supplied by the USSR. The larger of the two reactors was rated at 6.5 MW and used Soviet-supplied 80% enriched uranium fuel.

=== 1958 reactor incident ===
On 15 October 1958, there was a criticality accident at one of the research reactors. Six workers received large doses of radiation. One died shortly afterwards; the other five received the first ever bone marrow transplants in Europe.

Six young researchers, all between 24 and 26 years of age, were experimenting on the reactor, and the results were to be used by one student for his thesis. At some point, they smelled the strong scent of ozone. It took them 10 minutes to discover the origin of the ozone, but by that time they were already irradiated. The news was briefly broadcast by the state agency Tanjug, but the news on the incident was then suppressed. The reasons included the fact that the state commission concluded that the incident was caused by the researchers' carelessness and indiscipline. The patients were first treated in Belgrade, under the care of Dr. Vasa Janković. Thanks to the personal connections of the Institute director Pavle Savić, who was a collaborator of Irène and Frédéric Joliot-Curie, they were transferred to the Curie Institute in Paris.

In Paris, they were treated by oncologist Georges Mathé. Five researchers were heavily radiated: Rosanda Dangubić, Života Vranić, Radojko Maksić, Draško Grujić and Stijepo Hajduković, while Živorad Bogojević received a low dose of radiation. Mathé operated on all five of them, performing the first successful allogeneic bone marrow transplant ever performed on unrelated human beings. The donors were all French: Marcel Pabion, Albert Biron, Raymond Castanier, and Odette Draghi—mother of four young children. The fifth donor was Léon Schwartzenberg, a member of Mathé's team. On 11 November 1958, Maksić became the first man to receive a graft from an unrelated donor (Pabion). Out of five treated patients, only Vranić died. The others recovered and returned to Belgrade to continue working in Vinča or other institutes. Several years later, Dangubić gave birth to a healthy baby girl.

=== Removal of radioactive waste ===
In the 1980s, the waste was kept in the open. The waste was then transferred into two hangars, H1 and H2, while the ground was remediated. Until 1990, the waste from the entire country of Yugoslavia was stored in Vinča. H2 also harbors the barrels with the depleted uranium and DU bullets, remnants of the ammunition collected on four locations in south Serbia after the 1999 NATO bombing of Serbia.

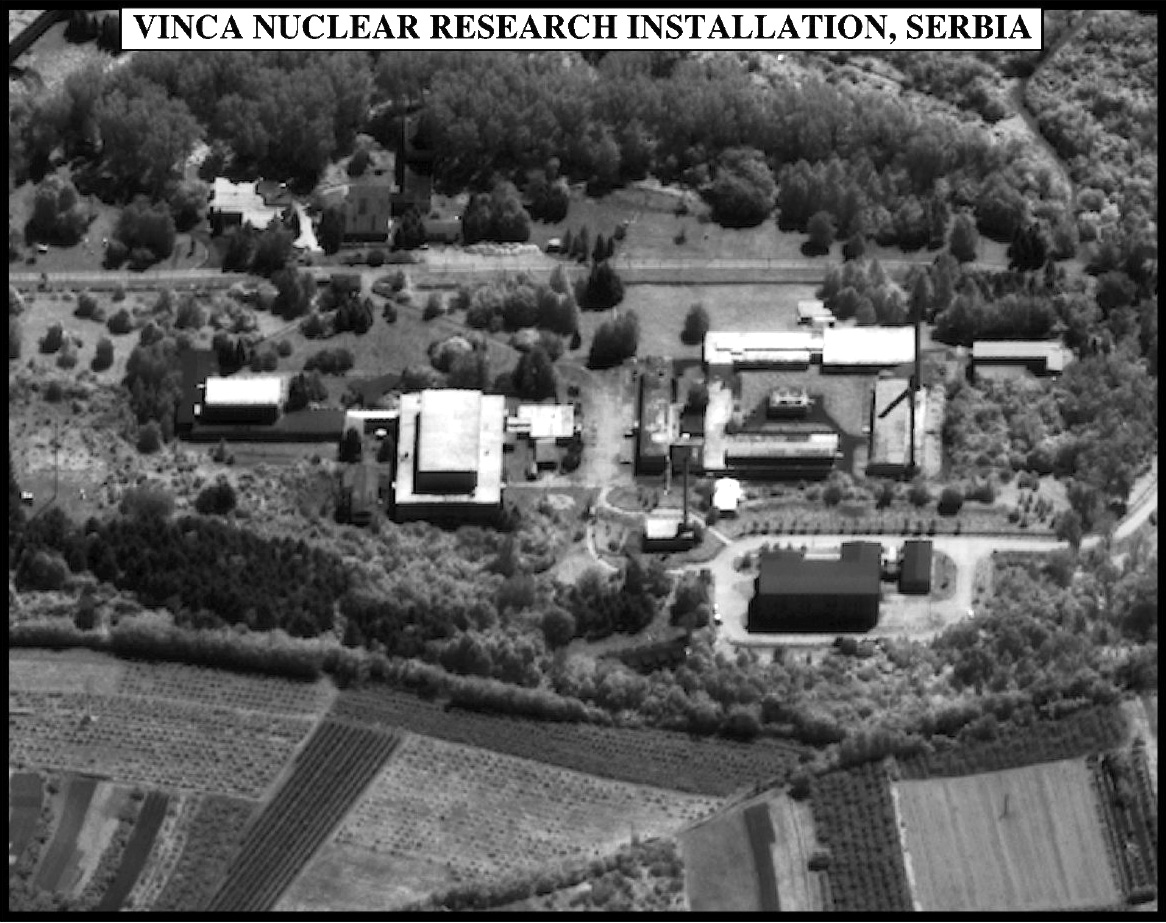
Vinča Institute of Nuclear Sciences

In August 2002, a joint US-Russian mission removed 100 pounds of highly enriched uranium from the Vinča Nuclear Institute, to be flown to Russia.

In 2009, it was reported that the nuclear fuel storage pool, containing large quantities of radioactive waste, was in poor condition.

In 2010, 2.5 tonnes of waste, including 13 kg of 80% highly enriched uranium, were transported from Vinča to a reprocessing facility at Mayak, Russia. This was the IAEA's largest ever technical cooperation project, and thousands of police protected the convoys.

Removal of the nuclear waste allows decommissioning of Vinča's remaining reactor to be completed.

In 2012, the Law on Radiation Protection and Nuclear Safety was adopted. It envisioned that within 10 years, that is by 2022, the waste from Vinča must be transferred to the permanent and safe depository location. A new and modern hangar, H3, was built in the meantime, but due to the legal procedures and licensing problems, it is still closed. However, it is meant to be only a transition location where the processed waste from H1 is to be kept before being transported to the permanent location. Still, as of 2018, large quantities of nuclear waste remain in the institute, the permanent location hasn't been selected, and the waste is not being treated and processed at all.

The waste in Vinča is of low to mid-level radioactivity, which means it is potentially hazardous for the health and safety of the wider area of Serbia, not just for Belgrade. Additionally, after removing all the radioactive waste, the institute can truly be transformed into a modern scientific-business park.

In 2024, the institute was awarded the Sretenje Order, second class.

== Publishing ==
Vinča Nuclear Institute is a publisher of three journals, two among them are listed in Scopus and WoS: Thermal Science and Nuclear Technology & Radiation Protection.
