= Renewable Energy (journal) =

Monthly peer-reviewed scientific journal

- Discipline: Energy and fuel
- Language: English

Publication details
- Former names: Solar & Wind Technology
- History: 1984–present
- Publisher: Elsevier
- Frequency: Monthly
- Impact factor: 8.634 (2021)

Standard abbreviations
- ISO 4: Renew. Energy

Indexing
- CODEN: RNENE3
- ISSN: 0960-1481 (print); 1879-0682 (web)
- LCCN: 93640683

Links
- Journal homepage

Renewable Energy is a monthly peer-reviewed scientific journal covering research on renewable energy, sustainable energy and the energy transition. It is published by Elsevier and the editor-in-chief is Soteris Kalogirou (Cyprus University of Technology). According to the Journal Citation Reports, the journal has a 2021 impact factor of 8.634. It was originally established as Solar & Wind Technology in 1984, acquiring its current name in 1991.

== See also ==
- List of renewable energy journals
