= Cyprus Academy of Sciences, Letters and Arts =

The Cyprus Academy of Sciences, Letters and Arts (Greek language: Κυπριακή Ακαδημία Επιστημών, Γραμμάτων και Τεχνών) was founded in 2017 and launched by the President of Cyprus Nicos Anastasiades in 2018. Its aim is to enhance the scientific and cultural achievements of Cyprus by promoting and rewarding excellence in Science, Letters, and Arts, and cultivating interactions between the Sciences, Letters, Humanities, and the Arts in the Republic of Cyprus. It is an independent and autonomous institution consisting of 3 Sections: • Natural Sciences, • Letters, and Arts (Humanities), • and Ethical Sciences, Economic and Political Sciences.

The Cyprus Academy has already been admitted in several European and international bodies including All European Academies (ALLEA), the European Federation of Academies of Sciences and Humanities and the European Academies Science Advisory Council (EASAC).

The current body of the Cyprus Academy consists of 17 Members, 12 Founding Members elected on April 10, 2019, the four Members of the Founding Committee, and one recently elected ordinary member. The Academy also elected one external and two corresponding members in each of the three sections. The Academy is governed by an Interim Governing Board presided by Professor Andreas Demetriou.

The Cyprus Academy of Sciences, Letters and Arts, is temporarily located in an especially provided building at the Phaneromene Square in Nicosia.
