= Energy Conversion and Management =

- Discipline: Energy
- Language: English
- Edited by: Sylvie Lorente

Publication details
- History: 1979–present
- Publisher: Elsevier
- Frequency: Biweekly
- Impact factor: 10.9 (2024)

Standard abbreviations
- ISO 4: Energy Convers. Manag.

Indexing
- CODEN: ECMADL
- ISSN: 0196-8904
- OCLC no.: 630214908

Links
- Journal homepage; Online access; Online archive

Energy Conversion and Management is a biweekly peer-reviewed scientific journal covering research on energy generation, utilization, conversion, storage, transmission, conservation, management, and sustainability that was established in 1979. It is published by Elsevier and the editor-in-chief is Sylvie Lorente (Villanova University), while Moh'd Ahmad Al-Nimr (Jordan University of Science and Technology) is honorary editor-in-chief.

== Abstracting and indexing ==
The journal is abstracted and indexed in Current Contents/Engineering, Computing & Technology, Science Citation Index Expanded, and Scopus. According to the Journal Citation Reports, the journal has a 2024 impact factor of 10.9.
