= Smart Energy =

- Discipline: Renewable energy
- Language: English
- Edited by: Brian Vad Mathiesen

Publication details
- History: 2021-present
- Publisher: Elsevier
- Frequency: 4 per year
- Open access: Yes
- License: CC BY-NC-ND 3.0
- Impact factor: 5.0 (2024)

Standard abbreviations
- ISO 4: Smart Energy

Indexing
- CODEN: SEMNBM
- ISSN: 2666-9552
- LCCN: 2666-9552
- OCLC no.: 1251471326

Links
- Journal homepage; Online access

Smart Energy is an international, peer-reviewed open-access multi-disciplinary scientific journal focused on energy transition to upcoming smart renewable energy systems. The journal was established in 2021 and is published by Elsevier. The editor-in-chief is Brian Vad Mathiesen (Aalborg University). It is emphasized that efforts to advocate UN's goals of sustainable development are welcomed, specifically "Affordable and clean energy".

== Abstracting and indexing ==
The journal is abstracted and indexed in Scopus, and the Directory of Open Access Journals.

== See also ==
- List of renewable energy journals
