= Thermal Science =

- Discipline: Thermodynamics
- Language: English
- Edited by: Vukman Bakić

Publication details
- History: 1997–present
- Publisher: VINCA Institute of Nuclear Sciences
- Frequency: 6 per year
- Open access: Yes
- License: CC BY-NC-ND 3.0
- Impact factor: 1.971 (2021)

Standard abbreviations
- ISO 4: Therm. Sci.

Indexing
- ISSN: 0354-9836 (print); 2334-7163 (web)
- OCLC no.: 909889878

Links
- Journal homepage; Online access; Online archive

Thermal Science is a peer-reviewed open-access scientific journal founded in 1997 and published by Vinča Institute of Nuclear Sciences. The journal is focused on physics and chemistry, and aims to amplify recent scientific results accomplished in Serbia and Southeast Europe.

The editor-in-chief is Vukman Bakić (Vinča Institute of Nuclear Sciences, Serbia) and Editor-In-Chief Emeritus is Prof Simeon Oka (University of Belgrade, Serbia). Since beginning of 2021 year, authors need to pay article processing charges, and they retain unrestricted copyrights and publishing rights.

== Abstracting and indexing ==
Since 2007 year, the journal is abstracted and indexed in Scopus, and the Science Citation Index Expanded. According to the Journal Citation Reports, the journal has a 2021 impact factor of 1.971.
