= International Journal of Sustainable Energy Planning and Management =

Academic journal covering sustainability studies

- Discipline: Sustainability studies
- Language: English
- Edited by: Poul Alberg Østergaard

Publication details
- History: 2014–present
- Publisher: Aalborg University Press (Denmark)
- Frequency: Continuous
- Open access: Yes
- License: CC BY-NC-ND 3.0

Standard abbreviations
- ISO 4: Int. J. Sustain. Energy Plan. Manag.

Indexing
- ISSN: 2246-2929
- OCLC no.: 895736108

Links
- Journal homepage; Online access; Online archive

The International Journal of Sustainable Energy Planning and Management is a quarterly peer-reviewed open-access academic journal covering all aspects of sustainability studies. The journal was established in 2014 and is published by Aalborg University Press. The editor-in-chief is Poul Alberg Østergaard (Aalborg University). The journal has no article processing charges.

== Abstracting and indexing ==
The journal is abstracted and indexed in Ei Compendex and Scopus.
