= Renewable and Sustainable Energy Reviews =

- Discipline: Sustainable energy
- Language: English
- Edited by: Soteris Kalogirou

Publication details
- History: 1997–present
- Publisher: Elsevier
- Frequency: Monthly
- Impact factor: 16.3 (2024)

Standard abbreviations
- ISO 4: Renew. Sustain. Energy Rev.

Indexing
- ISSN: 1364-0321

Links
- Journal homepage

Renewable and Sustainable Energy Reviews is a monthly peer-reviewed scientific journal covering research on sustainable energy. It is published by Elsevier and the Editor-in-chief is Soteris Kalogirou (Cyprus University of Technology). As of 2025, the journal has an impact factor of 16.3. According to the Journal Citation Reports, the journal has a 2024 impact factor of 16.3.

The journal considers articles based on the themes of energy resources, applications, utilization, environment, techno-socio-economic aspects, systems, and sustainability.

== See also ==
- List of renewable energy journals
