= Energy (journal) =

- Discipline: Energy and fuel
- Language: English
- Edited by: Henrik Lund

Publication details
- History: 1976–present
- Publisher: Elsevier
- Frequency: Monthly
- Impact factor: 9.0 (2022)

Standard abbreviations
- ISO 4: Energy (Oxf.)

Indexing
- CODEN: ENEYDS
- ISSN: 0360-5442 (print); 1873-6785 (web)
- LCCN: 77640513
- OCLC no.: 2235570

Links
- Journal homepage

Energy is a peer-reviewed academic journal covering research on energy engineering that was established in 1976. It is published by Elsevier (formerly Pergamon Press) and the editor-in-chief is Henrik Lund (Aalborg University). According to the Journal Citation Reports, the journal has a 2022 impact factor of 9.0.

== Abstracting and indexing ==
The journal is abstracted and indexed in:

- CAB Abstracts
- Compendex
- EBSCO databases
- Inspec
- Science Citation Index Expanded
- Scopus
