= Applied Energy =

- Discipline: Energy
- Language: English
- Edited by: Jinyue Yan

Publication details
- Publisher: Elsevier
- Impact factor: 11.446 (2021)

Standard abbreviations
- ISO 4: Appl. Energy

Indexing
- ISSN: 0306-2619

Links
- Journal homepage

Applied Energy is a peer-reviewed academic journal covering research on energy engineering that was established in 1975. The journal covers areas of energy conversion and conservation, the optimal use of energy resources, analysis and optimization of energy processes, mitigation of environmental pollutants, and sustainable energy systems. The Editor-in-Chiefs are Jianzhong Wu and Zita Vale.

According to the Journal Citation Reports, the journal has a 2021 impact factor of 11.446, ranking it 6 out of 143 journals in the category "Engineering, Chemical".
