= List of energy journals =

List of academic journals covering energy

This list of energy journals includes academic journals covering energy, fuel, renewable energy, energy policy, energy economics, nuclear power, and related topics.

== Journals ==
=== General energy ===
- Applied Energy
- Energies
- Energy
- Energy Reports
- Energy Technology
- Frontiers in Energy
- Fuel
- International Journal of Energy Research
- Nature Energy

=== Energy systems and storage ===
- ACS Applied Energy Materials
- ACS Energy Letters
- Advanced Energy Materials
- Batteries
- Energy & Environmental Science
- Energy & Fuels
- Energy Conversion and Management
- Energy Storage Materials
- Journal of Power Sources
- Joule
- Nano Energy

=== Buildings, heat, and thermal engineering ===
- Applied Thermal Engineering
- Energy and Buildings
- Flow, Turbulence and Combustion
- Heat and Mass Transfer
- Progress in Energy and Combustion Science

=== Renewable energy ===
- Energy for Sustainable Development
- Journal of Renewable and Sustainable Energy
- Renewable Energy
- Renewable and Sustainable Energy Reviews
- Smart Energy

==== Solar energy ====
- Progress in Photovoltaics
- Solar Energy
- Solar Energy Materials and Solar Cells

==== Wind energy ====
- Wind Energy
- Wind Engineering

=== Hydrogen and fuel cells ===
- Fuel Cells
- International Journal of Hydrogen Energy

=== Nuclear energy ===
- Annals of Nuclear Energy
- Fusion Science and Technology
- Progress in Nuclear Energy

=== Climate, emissions, and carbon management ===
- International Journal of Greenhouse Gas Control

=== Policy, economics, and society ===
- Energy & Environment
- Energy Economics
- The Energy Journal
- Energy Policy
- Energy Research & Social Science
- Oil, Gas and Energy Law
- Resource and Energy Economics

== See also ==
- Comparison of fuel cell types
- List of books about renewable energy
- List of books about the energy industry
- List of energy magazines
- List of energy storage systems
- List of environmental journals
- List of power station types
- List of scientific journals
- Lists of academic journals
- IEEE Power & Energy Society
- Energy engineering
- Methanol economy
- Natural hydrogen
- Wind energy software
