= List of renewable energy journals =

List of journals about renewable energy

This is a list of renewable energy journals that focus on topics related to solar energy, wind power, bioenergy, geothermal energy, energy storage, and other renewable energy topics.

== Journals ==
=== General renewable and sustainable energy ===
- Applied Energy
- Energies
- Energy and Buildings
- Energy Conversion and Management
- Energy for Sustainable Development
- Journal of Cleaner Production
- Journal of Renewable and Sustainable Energy
- Nature Energy
- Renewable and Sustainable Energy Reviews
- Renewable Energy
- Smart Energy

=== Solar energy ===
- Progress in Photovoltaics
- Solar Energy
- Solar Energy Materials and Solar Cells

=== Wind energy ===
- IET Renewable Power Generation
- Wind Energy
- Wind Engineering

=== Bioenergy and biofuels ===
- Bioresource Technology
- GCB Bioenergy

=== Geothermal energy ===
- Journal of Volcanology and Geothermal Research

=== Energy systems, storage, and integration ===
- ACS Energy Letters
- ACS Sustainable Chemistry & Engineering
- Advanced Energy Materials
- Batteries
- Energy
- Energy & Environmental Science
- Energy Reports
- Energy Storage Materials
- Energy Technology
- International Journal of Energy Research
- International Journal of Hydrogen Energy
- Journal of the Electrochemical Society
- Journal of Power Sources
- Joule
- Nano Energy

=== Policy and economics ===
- Energy Economics
- Energy Policy
- Energy Research & Social Science
- Resource and Energy Economics
- The Energy Journal

== See also ==
- List of books about renewable energy
- List of energy and fuel journals
- List of environmental journals
- List of engineering journals and magazines
- List of long-duration energy storage technologies
- List of scientific journals
- Lists of academic journals
- Photovoltaic Specialists Conference
- Windpower Monthly
