= List of nuclear science journals =

List of academic journals in nuclear science and engineering

This is a list of nuclear science journals which includes peer-reviewed scientific journals covering nuclear physics, nuclear engineering, reactor design, radiation detection, and related areas of nuclear technology.

== Journals ==
=== Nuclear physics ===
- Acta Physica Polonica B
- Annual Review of Nuclear and Particle Science
- Atomic Data and Nuclear Data Tables
- Chinese Physics C
- European Physical Journal A
- European Physical Journal C
- International Journal of Modern Physics E
- Journal of Physics G
- Nuclear Physics (journal)
- Nuclear Physics A
- Nuclear Physics B
- Nuclear Physics and Atomic Energy
- Physical Review and their sub-journals
- Physical Review C
- Physical Review D
- Physics Letters B

=== Nuclear engineering and technology ===
- Annals of Nuclear Energy
- International Journal of Energy Research
- Journal of Nuclear Materials
- Nuclear Science and Engineering
- Nuclear Science and Techniques
- Nuclear Technology
- Nukleonik
- Progress in Nuclear Energy

=== Nuclear fusion and plasma physics ===
- Fusion Engineering and Design
- IEEE Transactions on Plasma Science
- Magnetohydrodynamics (journal)
- Nuclear Fusion
- Physics of Plasmas
- Plasma Physics and Controlled Fusion
- Plasma Physics Reports
- Plasma Science and Technology
- Plasma Sources Science and Technology

=== Radiation science and protection ===
- Applied Radiation and Isotopes
- Health Physics
- International Journal of Radiation Biology
- Journal of Radioanalytical and Nuclear Chemistry
- Journal of Radiological Protection
- Radiation Measurements
- Radiation Protection Dosimetry

=== Instrumentation and experimental methods ===
- IEEE Transactions on Nuclear Science
- Journal of Instrumentation
- Nuclear Instruments and Methods in Physics Research
- Physical Review Accelerators and Beams
- Review of Scientific Instruments

== See also ==
- American Nuclear Society
- International Atomic Energy Agency
- List of energy journals
- List of engineering journals and magazines
- List of physics journals
- List of plasma physics software
- List of computational physics software
- List of computational chemistry software
- List of nuclear engineers
- List of scientific journals
- List of unsolved problems in nuclear physics
- Lists of academic journals
- Radiation chemistry

=== Conferences ===
- Gordon Research Conferences
- International Conference on High Energy Physics
- International Conference on Neutrino Physics and Astrophysics
