= Volker Quaschning =

German engineer and professor

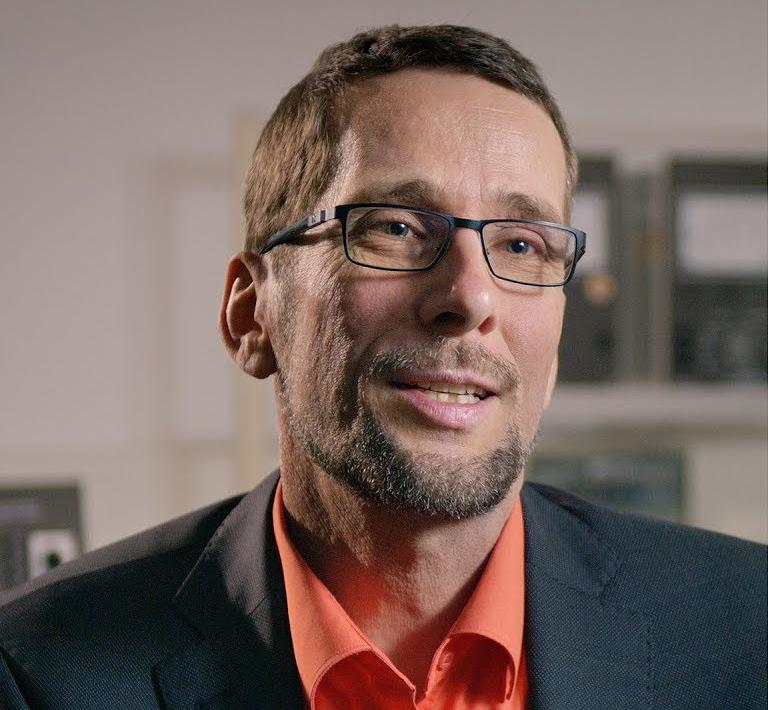
- Born: 1969 (age 56–57); Leonberg, West Germany
- Education: Karlsruhe Institute of Technology
- Scientific career
- Fields: Electrical engineering, renewable energy
- Workplaces: Hochschule für Technik und Wirtschaft Berlin

Volker Quaschning (born 1969) is a German engineer and professor of renewable energy systems at the Hochschule für Technik und Wirtschaft Berlin, Germany.

== Life ==
Quaschning studied electrical engineering at Karlsruhe Institute of Technology, then wrote his PhD on photovoltaics at the Technische Universität Berlin. After obtaining his habilitation on low-carbon power system scenarios for Germany, he worked for the German Aerospace Center in Almeria, Spain and lead research into concentrated solar power. In 2004, Quaschning was appointed professor of renewable energy systems at the Hochschule für Technik und Wirtschaft Berlin.

Quaschning is the author of several books, including the scientific textbook Regenerative Energiesysteme (Renewable energy systems), first published in 1998. In 2015, the ninth edition of this book was released. The book has been translated in English, Arabic, and Russian and a translation to the Kazakh language is in progress. In 2016, an updated second edition in English was published.

For his statements about nuclear energy risks, the unsolved problem of radioactive waste management in Germany, and the much faster, cheaper and safer expansion of renewables he has been criticised by other scientists and his arguments mocked by pro-nuclear lobbying groups like Nuklearia e.V. a lobby organization registered at the German Bundestag

== Books ==
- Understanding Renewable Energy Systems. Earthscan, London, 2nd edition 2016, ISBN 978-113878-196-2.
- Regenerative Energiesysteme. Hanser, Munich, 9th edition 2015, ISBN 978-3-446-44267-2.
- Erneuerbare Energien und Klimaschutz. Hanser, Munich, 3rd edition 2013, ISBN 978-3-446-43809-5.
- Obnovitelné zdroje energií, Grada Publishing Prague, 2010, ISBN 978-80-247-3250-3.
- Mülltrenner, Müsliesser und Klimaschützer. Hanser, Munich, 2010, ISBN 978-3-446-42261-2.
- Renewable Energy and Climate Change. John Wiley & Sons Ltd, Chichester, 2010, ISBN 978-0-470-74707-0.
- Systemtechnik einer klimaverträglichen Elektrizitätsversorgung in Deutschland für das 21. Jahrhundert. VDI-Verlag 2000, ISBN 978-3-18-343706-1, Online.
- Simulation der Abschattungsverluste bei solarelektrischen Systemen. Phd Berlin 1996.

== Selected scientific papers ==
- Schultz et al.: Laser-induced local phase transformation of CIGSe for monolithic serial interconnection: Analysis of the material properties. In: Solar Energy Materials and Solar Cells 157, (2016), pp 636–643, doi:10.1016/j.solmat.2016.07.013.
- J. Weniger., T. Tjaden, V. Quaschning: Sizing of residential PV battery systems. Energy Procedia 46 (2014), pp. 78–87, doi:10.1016/j.egypro.2014.01.160.
- B. Stegemann, M. Schüle, C. Schultz, H-U. Pahl, J. Niederhofer, H. Endert, V. Quaschning, F. Fink: Laserbasierte Serienverschaltung von Chalkopyrit-Dünnschicht-Solarzellen. In: Jahrbuch Oberflächentechnik 2012 (Band 68), pp. 356–362.
- B. Stegemann, M. Schüle, C. Schultz, H-U. Pahl, J. Niederhofer, H. Endert, V. Quaschning, F. Fink: Novel Concept for Laser Patterning of Thin Film Solar Cells. In: Laser Technik Journal 9 Issue 1 (Januar 2012), pp. 25–29 doi:10.1002/latj.201290004.
- N. Geuder, V. Quaschning: Soiling of irradiation sensors and methods for soiling correction. Solar Energy 80 (2006), pp. 1402–1409 doi:10.1016/j.solener.2006.06.001.
- V. Quaschning: Technical and economical system comparison of photovoltaic and concentrating solar thermal power systems depending on annual global irradiation. Solar Energy 77 (2004), pp. 171–178, doi:10.1016/j.solener.2004.04.011.
- V. Quaschning, R. Kistner, W. Ortmanns: Influence of Direct Normal Irradiance Variation on the Optimal Parabolic Trough Field Size: A Problem Solved with Technical and Economical Simulations. In: Journal of Solar Energy Engineering 124, (2002), pp 160-164, doi:10.1115/1.1465432.
- V. Quaschning, R. Hanitsch: Irradiance Calculations on Shaded Surfaces. Solar Energy 62 Issue 5, 1998, pp. 369–375, doi:10.1016/S0038-092X(98)00018-8.
- V. Quaschning, R. Hanitsch: Numerical simulation of current-voltage characteristics of photovoltaic systems with shaded solar cells. In: Solar Energy 56, (1996), pp. 513-520, doi:10.1016/0038-092X(96)00006-0.
