= Jeffrey Currie =

American economist

Jeff Currie
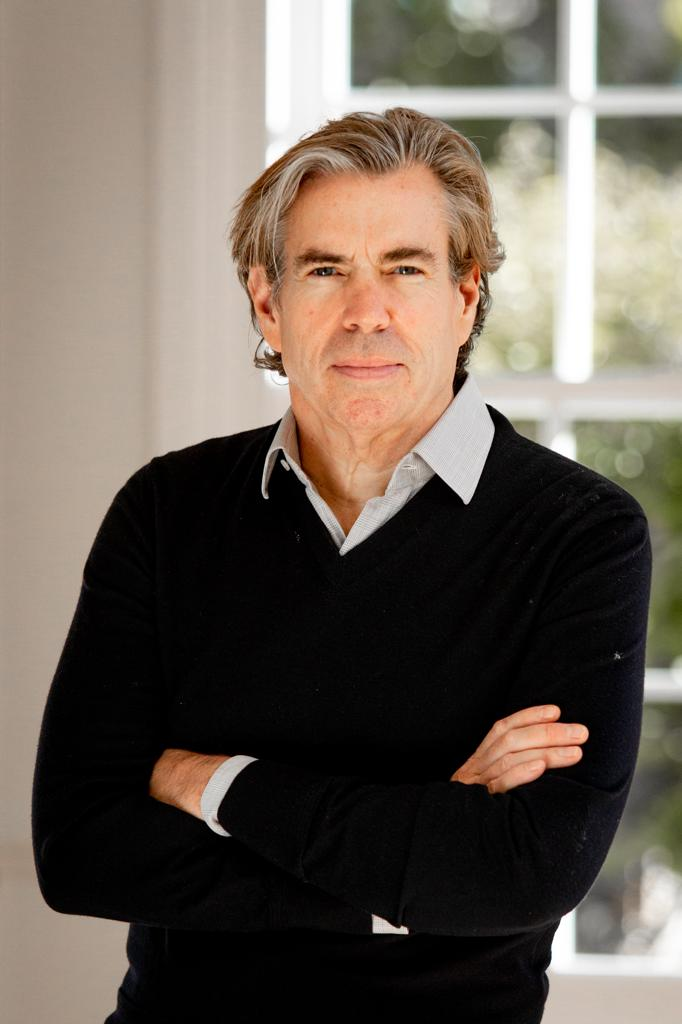
- Born: Reno, Nevada
- Title: Founder and CEO of Real Macro, co-founder and director of 1947 Oil and Gas, senior advisor at The Carlyle Group, non-executive director of Abaxx Technologies,

Academic background
- Education: University of Chicago (MA, PhD 1996); Pepperdine University (BA 1987)
- Influences: George S. Tolley; Arnold Zellner

Academic work
- Discipline: Applied economics; Energy economics
- Institutions: Abaxx Exchange, Goldman Sachs, The Carlyle Group
- Awards: Zellner Thesis Award 1997; CNBC Analyst of the Year 2011

Jeff Currie is an economist. He is currently co-founder and director of 1947 Oil and Gas, and formerly worked at Goldman Sachs. He rose to prominence during the 2000s by forecasting the commodity super-cycle and oil spiking above $100 a barrel.

During the 2010s Currie was known for forecasting oil prices to stay 'lower for longer' to end the shale supply glut, whilst in more recent times his stance has shifted from bearish to considerably bullish, calling for a new commodities "supercycle" in late 2020 driven by underinvestment in supply, a process he has dubbed "the revenge of the old economy."

In August 2023, Currie was appointed chair of the Advisory Group of The Energy Policy Institute at the University of Chicago (EPIC). In February 2024, Currie joined The Carlyle Group.

== Early life ==
Born in Reno, Nevada, Currie attended Sprague High School in Salem, Oregon, before attending Pepperdine University, in Malibu, California, where he obtained a Bachelor of Arts Economics in December 1987.

Currie earned a Master of Arts Economics at the University of Chicago in December 1990, and a PhD in economics from the university in June 1996.

== Career ==
=== Early career ===
Prior to joining Goldman Sachs, Currie taught undergraduate and graduate level courses in microeconomics and econometrics at The University of Chicago and served as the associate editor of Resource and Energy Economics.

=== Goldman Sachs ===
Currie joined Goldman Sachs in 1996, where he became managing director in 2002 before being named global head of commodities research in 2006, and a partner in 2008. Between 2010 and 2012, Currie was the European co-head of economics, commodities and strategy research, where he was based in London.

From 2008 until 2023, he was a partner and the global head of commodities research where he was responsible for conducting research on commodity market dynamics in the context of corporate risk management programs, short and long-term commodity investment strategies, and asset allocation.

In July 2003, Currie was selected as one of eight leading gas and energy executives by the United States House Committee on Energy and Commerce to discuss the natural gas supply-demand imbalance that was occurring at the time.

In April 2004, Currie warned of the 'revenge of the old economy' after decades of a lack of investment in the old economy, claiming that higher commodity prices were likely needed to attracted capital. Three months later, in July 2004, Currie authored a Goldman Sachs report that forecasted rising long-term oil prices, arguing that the 'global oil industry is at capacity'.

In March 2007, Currie authored a Goldman Sachs report title Food, Feed and Fuel, which argued the demand pull from food, feed and fuel represented the beginning of a structural increase in prices. Several months later, in July 2007, Currie discussed with Bloomberg the potential impact rising oil prices could have on the global economy. He correctly predicted that oil prices would 'exceed $90 by the end of 2007.

Currie jolted global commodity markets in April 2011 by closing a China themed trading recommendation to be long a basket of crude oil, copper, cotton and platinum (CCCP). The Commodity Market crashed several weeks later. Currie then correctly foresaw the biggest decline in the price of gold for three decades in April 2013, two days ahead of the crash.

Currie co-authored a Goldman Sachs Report in June 2014, titled 'Unlocking the economic potential of North America's energy resources', published at the North American Energy Summit. The report called for a focus on unlocking North America's natural gas potential. Later that year, in October 2014, Currie discussed the 'New Oil Order', arguing that the United States' shale revolution was reshaping global energy markets and forcing them to reassess supply and demand balance.

In November 2017, during an interview with Bloomberg, Currie stated that Bitcoin should be considered a commodity that shares many similarities with gold.

He is a regular commentator on commodity markets and cryptocurrency, featuring on Sky News, Bloomberg and CNBC.

In November 2020, The Daily Telegraph referred to Currie as the "world's most followed energy guru" and reported on his convictions on a new commodity supercycle. Currie predicted Brent prices to reach $65 in the last quarter of 2021. Then, at the end of 2020, Currie argued that a long-lasting bull market for commodities had started.

In January 2021, The Economist also reported on the possibility of a new supercycle, quoting Currie's assertion that the COVID-19 pandemic could represent a "catalyst for a commodity supercycle".

In light of the surge in attention around Gamestop stock, spurred on by social media platform Reddit, Currie questioned the potential influence of retail investors on commodity markets during an interview with Bloomberg in February 2021.

=== Post-Goldman Career ===
In August 2023, Goldman Sachs announced that Currie was leaving the company after 27 years, stating that he had “played a significant role in strengthening our commodities franchise”. At the time of his retirement from Goldman, Fortune featured a quote from a long-term associate Colleen Foster who said of Currie: "There’s never a time I couldn’t get a meeting with a CEO, an oil minister or a hedge fund founder, if Jeff Currie was with me."

In September 2023, Currie was announced as a non-executive director of Canadian financial software company, Abaxx Technologies.

In October 2023, Currie was appointed as director of the company by the board of international drilling contractor, Borr Drilling.

Currie was a key speaker alongside other leading private, public and Governmental figures at the Future Minerals Forum 2024, where he contributed to the conference's key focus on the mineral sector across Africa, Western and Central Asia. Also during 2024, he was named on the board of electrical equipment manufacturing company, I-Pulse.

==== The Carlyle Group ====
In February 2024, Currie joined global investment firm The Carlyle Group as chief strategy officer of Energy Pathways, a role that will focus on commodity market trends, the commodity supply chain and the energy transition.

Currie's first flagship research, The New Joule Order_{,} published by Carlyle in March 2025, argued that the next era in energy will be defined less by climate imperatives and more by energy security, with Currie predicting a shift from "Peak Oil" to "Peak Trade". The research was covered various global media outlets including Bloomberg.

Currie followed up that research with The New Martial Plan, dubbed a sequel to The New Joule Order. Again published by Carlyle, Currie argued that the shifting security landscape is driving economies to prioritise defense investment, and projected that incremental direct investment across Europe in defense and adjacent infrastructure could reach €9 trillion over the next decade.

Later in 2025, during an episode of The United States Chamber of Commerce's The Call, Currie declared copper a vital strategic resource that is central to energy transition, defense, and technology supply chains, concluding that "Wars are won with supply chains and capital."
