= Alma Howard =

Canadian-born English radiobiologist (1913–1984)

- Born: 23 October 1913; Montreal, Quebec, Canada
- Died: 1 April 1984 (aged 70); Sutton, London, England
- Resting place: Pine Hill Cemetery, Magog, Stanstead, Quebec; 45.27800°N 72.14757°W
- Other name: Alma Howard Rolleston Ebert
- Education: BSc, PhD
- Alma mater: McGill University
- Known for: Co-creator of the concept and nomenclature of the cell cycle
- Spouses: Patrick William Rolleston; Michael Ebert
- Children: 2
- Scientific career
- Fields: Radiobiology
- Institutions: McGill University; Hammersmith Hospital; Mount Vernon Hospital; Paterson Laboratories
- Patrons: Louis Harold Gray
- Thesis: The correlation between chromosome behaviour and susceptibility to mammary gland cancer in mice (1938)
- Doctoral advisor: Charles Leonard Huskins

Alma Clavering Howard Rolleston Ebert (23 October 1913 – 1 April 1984) was a Canadian-born English radiobiologist. She was joint editor for many years of the International Journal of Radiation Biology and deputy director of Paterson Laboratories in Manchester. She made a "fundamental contribution to cell biology" in collaboration with physicist Stephen Pelc when they "were the first to ascribe a timeframe to cellular life," creating the concept of the cell cycle. Their nomenclature for the stages of cell replication is used universally and appears in every textbook of biology and pathology.

She married twice after the start of her career but published, and was generally known in the scientific community, under her maiden name.

== Biography ==
=== Early life and education ===
Alma Clavering Howard was born in Montréal on 23 October 1913, the fourth and youngest child of barrister Eratus Edwin Howard and Evalyn Isobel Peverley. Her paternal aunt was the mother of Northrop Frye, a cousin who would become one of the twentieth century's most influential literary critics and theorists. First educated at the Trafalgar School for Girls, she attended McGill University, graduating in 1934 with an Hons. B.Sc. in Botany and Zoology. She then completed graduate studies at McGill in the Department of Genetics under Charles Leonard Huskins. Her Ph.D. thesis was The correlation between chromosome behaviour and susceptibility to mammary gland cancer in mice (1938), for which she won the Governor General's Academic Medal for graduate work in science.

=== Career ===
In 1939, Howard married Patrick William Rolleston and took up a Finney-Howell Research Fellowship at McGill. She was demonstrator in Genetics at McGill into 1940 and "in the course of this work she discovered a new murine mutation". In 1940, her first son, Francis, was born, followed by a second son, Patrick, in 1942. After World War II, she moved with her husband and children to England. However, her husband died in 1947 and her colleague Jack Boag would later note that she "had to find work which would allow her freedom to bring up her two young sons". At the same time, Louis Harold Gray was looking for a cytologist to work in his radiobiology team at the UK Medical Research Council's Radiotherapeutic Research Unit at Hammersmith Hospital. By "fortunate chance he was introduced to Dr. Howard and flexible working arrangements were readily agreed". On a preliminary visit to the Radiotherapeutic Research Unit, she met physicist Stephen Pelc who had developed a variant autoradiograph technique and "was much interested in his use of radioactive iodine for the autoradiography of rat thyroid slices".

By 1949, her youngest son was old enough to start prep-school and Howard joined the staff at Hammersmith, becoming part of Gray's team of scientists dedicated to studying the biological effects of ionizing radiation and to developing the use of radioactive isotopes. As a geneticist, Howard already recognized the importance of DNA, and although the double helix structure would not be discovered for a few more years, "the idea that chromosomes are made of DNA was generally agreed on". On her first day, she suggested to Stephen Pelc that radioactive phosphorus taken into the cell might be incorporated into DNA and give some information on the replication and synthesis of this important substance. They injected a mouse with phosphorus-32 to study the rate at which the isotope incorporated into the DNA of dividing cells in the testis and the resulting autoradiographs were promising. However, in animal cells and tissues the background radioactivity from remaining Phosphorus-32 made it impossible to obtain an autoradiograph localized down to individual chromosomes and parts of chromosomes.

There were a limited number of radioactive isotopes available in the early 1950s, but Howard and Pelc switched to a botanical experimental system well established in Gray's lab, the bean root Vicia faba, and they were then able to continue their research with Phosphorus-32. In plant cells, unlike animal tissues, the radioactive phosphorus is incorporated into fewer complex compounds. By chance they discovered a simple acid digestion removed most of the Phosphorus-32 not synthesized into DNA. Looking at the uptake of Phosphorus-32 into the nucleus of dividing cells in the meristem of the broad bean root demonstrated the then "surprising conclusion that DNA replication occurs during a limited period in interphase, which they called "S-phase", the preceding "gap" was termed G_{1}, the subsequent one G_{2}". Howard and Pelc published this finding in 1953, the same year Watson and Crick published Molecular Structure of Nucleic Acids: A Structure for Deoxyribose Nucleic Acid. While Howard and Pelc were sure of the significance of their findings, "the relevance of cell-cycle studies in the bean root to either cancer or medicine was not immediately accepted." However, by 1957 [^{3}H]-thymidine and [^{14}C]-adenine radioligands became available, enabling animal studies, and consequently the whole basis of cell kinetics was developed from their original concepts.

While at Hammersmith, Howard also worked with Michael Ebert. They discovered that "excess pressures of the rare gases xenon, krypton and argon could suppress the oxygen enhancement effect on the radiation killing of Vicia faba cells". In 1956 Howard left Hammersmith and joined the new radiobiology research unit Gray was setting up at Mount Vernon Hospital. In 1958 she married Michael Ebert.

In 1960, she was appointed Secretary-General of the second International Radiation Research Congress, which was held in Harrogate in 1962. In 1963, both Howard and Ebert moved to Paterson Laboratories, where Howard was Head of the Radiobiology Group. They started, as joint editors, the journal Current Topics in Radiation Research. In 1966, Howard became deputy director at the Paterson Laboratories and also Joint Editor of International Journal of Radiation Biology, the later position held until her death. She "served the research community well by her rigorous standards of scientific accuracy and of literary style". Additional appointments included Chairman of the Association of Radiation Research and of the British Association for Cancer Research, and as Secretary and later Chairman of the L.H. Gray Trust.

Alma Howard began to suffer from progressive lameness around 1969 and her condition was eventually diagnosed as Multiple sclerosis. She "remained mobile" and carried on both her scientific work and hosted visiting scientists, postgraduate students and family friends from many countries at her home with Ebert in Chinley, White Hall. Both she and her husband Michael Ebert retired from active research in 1976. On 28 December 1982, while vacationing with his wife and family in Seefeld in Tirol, Michael Ebert died suddenly. Howard returned to England. She died on 1 April 1984 from cancer of the liver after a short terminal illness.

A contemporary from her days at McGill remembered her as a "strikingly handsome girl who took a lively part in the intense arguments that went on, but always managed to 'keep her cool' and to maintain an attitude of friendly respect combined with gracious dignity". Later colleague Jack Boag stated in her obituary that these "character traits remained with her throughout her life".

== Legacy ==
Howard was author or joint author of some 94 papers in the fields of genetics and radiobiology. On 24–25 July 1985, a Symposium in memory of Alma Howard, entitled The cell cycle concept and its applications, was held in Manchester and the papers published in a special issue of the International Journal of Radiation Biology. Following her death, the annual Alma Howard Memorial Lecture was inaugurated at McGill.

The fiftieth anniversary of Watson and Crick's publication of the double helix structure of DNA was in 2003 and their discovery was widely celebrated in the scientific community. However, some also noted that Howard and Pelc's discovery was "in danger of slipping past unmarked" and that their "paper, also published in 1953, ... set the scene for the model of the cell cycle as we know it today." While their findings are "now common place, the inventors are largely forgotten and rarely quoted." Despite this, "cell-cycle studies have flourished ... the concept was later developed and the checkpoints in cell-cycle regulation and universal control mechanisms were determined by using genetics and molecular biology."

Shirley Hornsey explained the clinical impact in her 1984 obituary of Alma Howard: "... the whole basis of cell kinetics was developed from their original concepts. These developments have led to our present understanding of the growth and turnover of tissues in health and disease and in the production and use of the cell-cycle based chemotherapeutic agents in the treatment of cancer."

== See also ==
- Timeline of women in science
