= Proposed Sustainable Development Goal 18 =

Sustainable Development Goal 18 for Space Sustainability refers to proposed frameworks that would extend the UN Sustainable Development Goals to include principles for the responsible use of outer space. This concept emerged from growing recognition that space activities, while beneficial to humanity, create unique sustainability challenges requiring global cooperation. The proposed SDG18 would typically encompass issues such as space debris mitigation, equitable access to orbits, protection of celestial environments, and the use of space technologies to support existing SDGs.

The concept connects to established fields including space law, orbital mechanics, space resource utilization, and environmental protection, while introducing new considerations about applying sustainability principles beyond Earth. It operates within the context of existing space governance mechanisms like the Outer Space Treaty of 1967 and more recent initiatives like the UN Guidelines for the Long-term Sustainability of Outer Space Activities.

== History and development ==
Discussions about space sustainability have grown in tandem with humanity's expanding presence in orbit. Early space law established a foundation – the 1967 Outer Space Treaty declared that space "must be used for the benefit of all countries and for peaceful purposes", and that we must avoid harmful contamination of celestial environments.

After the UN adopted 17 SDGs (with no space-specific goal) in 2015, space advocates began calling for an 18th. In 2018 the National Space Society (NSS) – U.S.-based a space advocacy NGO – formally proposed expanding the SDGs to include "the Sustainable Development of a Space Economy" as the 18th goal, arguing this would lay a foundation for humanity's future and help achieve the other SDGs. Around the same time, UN entities acknowledged the link between space and sustainability; a joint UNOOSA–EU report in 2018 emphasized global cooperation in space as key to achieving the SDGs. In 2019, scholars like Andreas Losch and colleagues introduced the term "planetary sustainability" and suggested an SDG for the space environment (not just the economy) to balance ecological and social concerns.

A 2020 article in the Leiden Law Blog highlighted the need for an 18th SDG on sustainable use of outer space. Since then, various events have propelled the discussion forward. By the 2020s, calls for a space SDG had entered academic literature and high-level policy discussions.

In March 2022, a workshop titled "SDG18.SPACE" was organized by eSpace - EPFL Space Center to discuss how an 18th SDG could be formulated specifically for the space environment. In March 2023, a team of international scientists writing in Science urged a legally-binding treaty to protect Earth's orbit, and in early 2025 researchers published a study in One Earth proposing an 18th SDG dedicated to "protecting Earth's orbit" from debris and congestion. Their proposal drew direct parallels with SDG14 (Life Below Water) – suggesting the space domain needs similar global goals and treaties to prevent a crisis in orbit. Meanwhile, the UN Committee on the Peaceful Uses of Outer Space (COPUOS) developed guidelines on the Long-Term Sustainability of Space Activities, which were adopted in 2019 – a sign of growing international resolve to tackle issues like orbital debris (though these guidelines are voluntary).

Space industry and nonprofit groups have also rallied: Space Renaissance International (SRI) and the National Space Society (NSS) formed a coalition in 2023–2024 advocating a "Space SDG" through workshops at the UN and other forums. In September 2024, these groups convened events during the UN Summit of the Future to push the idea, reflecting how far the conversation has progressed.

Grassroots and international initiatives soon followed. For example, a group of students in the Netherlands launched the "SDG18: Space for All" campaign, aiming to get space on the global agenda. They emphasized humanity's responsibility for ecosystems beyond Earth and outlined pillars like ecological wisdom in space and social justice regarding off-world resources.

While SDG18 is not (yet) an official UN goal, its development has been driven by a convergence of factors – mounting evidence of space sustainability challenges, visionary advocacy from the space community, and increasing recognition within the UN that outer space governance is integral to humanity's sustainable future.

== Key features and characteristics ==
The proposed SDG18 would likely encompass several key features, reflecting the diverse priorities of advocacy groups:

- Sustainable space resource utilization: Establishing frameworks for ethical and sustainable extraction of lunar and asteroid resources.
- Space debris mitigation and remediation: Measures to minimize space debris generation and remove existing debris to prevent orbital collisions.
- Equitable access: Ensuring all nations, including developing countries, have fair access to space resources and benefits.
- Peaceful use and cooperation: Aligning with international treaties to prevent the weaponization of space and encourage collaboration.
- Long-term protection of the space environment: Treating space as a fragile ecosystem that requires long-term preservation efforts.
- Integration with global sustainability: Ensuring space activities support Earth-based SDGs through sustainable financing, laws, and treaties.

== Related initiatives and practices ==
Although SDG18 is not officially adopted, several initiatives already promote space sustainability through international agreements, industry practices, and collaborative projects.

=== International treaties and guidelines ===
The Outer Space Treaty (1967) set foundational principles for peaceful and responsible space use, later expanded by the UN COPUOS Space Debris Mitigation Guidelines (2010) and Long-Term Sustainability of Outer Space Activities (2021). These voluntary but widely followed guidelines outline best practices, such as limiting debris release and designing satellites for safe disposal, effectively serving as a prototype for SDG18.

=== The Artemis Accords (2020) ===
Led by the U.S. and signed by over 25 countries, the Artemis Accords establish principles for sustainable space exploration. They emphasize debris mitigation, transparency, interoperability, and responsible resource use—aligning with SDG18's objectives. Though not universally adopted, they showcase how a coalition of nations is integrating sustainability into future Moon and Mars missions.

=== Space Sustainability Rating (SSR) and Industry Best Practices ===
Launched by the World Economic Forum, European Space Agency (ESA), and MIT, the SSR incentivizes satellite operators to follow debris mitigation measures. Companies like SpaceX and OneWeb have adopted responsible disposal strategies, while new technologies, such as drag sails and low-fuel deorbit systems, support more sustainable satellite lifecycles.

=== ESA's "Zero Debris by 2030" Initiative ===
The ESA aims to eliminate new space debris from European missions by 2030. Through stricter deorbiting requirements and industry partnerships, ESA's Zero Debris Charter is setting a precedent for global sustainability efforts.

=== Active Debris Removal and On-Orbit Servicing ===
Companies like Astroscale (Japan/UK) and ClearSpace (Switzerland/ESA) are pioneering debris removal technologies, such as capturing and deorbiting defunct satellites. On-orbit servicing, led by Northrop Grumman's Mission Extension Vehicle, extends satellite lifetimes, reducing the need for frequent launches and limiting orbital clutter.

=== Equitable access and capacity-building ===
Programs like UNOOSA's "Access to Space for All" provide developing nations with satellite deployment opportunities, while regional efforts like the African Space Agency and APSCO promote shared space technologies. Satellite data also aids disaster management in climate-vulnerable regions, reinforcing SDG18's goal of "inclusive access to space resources".

=== International cooperation in space science ===
The International Space Station (ISS) exemplifies long-term scientific collaboration, setting standards for debris avoidance and shared research. Future projects, such as the Lunar Gateway, Tiangong Program and Mars missions, integrate planetary protection and international data-sharing—laying the groundwork for sustainable deep-space exploration.

== Criticisms and limitations of SDG18 proposals ==
The proposals for an SDG on space sustainability faces several challenges. A key issue is the lack of consensus on its definition—stakeholders prioritize different aspects, such as environmental protection, economic growth, and equitable access, making it difficult to set clear goals and metrics.

Some critics argue that expanding human activities in space may conflict with sustainability. Increased launches, in-space manufacturing, and resource extraction on celestial bodies could have unforeseen environmental impacts, similar to industrialization on Earth.

Governance is another challenge. The existing legal framework, based on the 1967 Outer Space Treaty, does not fully address modern issues like space debris removal, resource utilization, and traffic management. Without updates, enforcing SDG18 would be difficult.

National interests also pose a barrier. Space capabilities are strategic assets, and some nations may resist sustainability commitments if they perceive them as limiting their competitive or security advantages. Economic concerns further complicate implementation, as sustainable spacecraft designs can be costly, potentially disadvantaging early adopters without financial incentives.

Adding a new SDG would require extensive UN negotiations, making it politically challenging. Some suggest integrating space sustainability into existing SDGs instead. Additionally, critics question whether prioritizing space sustainability is justified when pressing Earth-based development challenges remain unresolved.

== Cultural and regional variations ==
- US approach: Emphasizes commercial leadership with government oversight, focusing on debris mitigation and space traffic management.
- European approach: More regulatory, with strong emphasis on environmental protection and multilateral governance.
- Asian perspectives: Often focus on technological solutions and development rights for emerging space programs.
- Global South views: Frequently emphasize equitable access and benefit-sharing from space activities.
- Commercial sector: Increasingly adopting sustainability as a business imperative, balancing innovation with responsibility.

== Future directions ==
- Policy Developments: Growing support for an international space debris treaty.
- Integration with climate action: Growing recognition of connections between space sustainability and climate change mitigation
- Quantification efforts: Development of metrics and indicators to measure space sustainability.
- Technological solutions: Increased focus on technologies for debris removal, sustainable propulsion, and end-of-life disposal.
- Governance innovation: Experiments with new models of space governance involving multiple stakeholders.
- Awareness campaigns: Efforts to increase public and policymaker understanding of space sustainability challenges.
- Scientific research: Expanding studies on environmental impacts of space activities, both in orbit and on celestial bodies.
