= Jovan Todorović =

Serbian–American film director and artist (born 1979)

- Јован Тодоровић
- Born: Jovan Branislav Todorović; 1979 (age 46–47); Belgrade, SR Serbia
- Education: Columbia College Chicago; Faculty of Dramatic Arts (MFA)
- Occupations: Film director; photographer; musician
- Years active: 2009–present
- Organization: Directors Guild of America
- Father: Branislav Todorović

Jovan Branislav Todorović (Serbian: Јован Бранислав Тодоровић; born 1979) is a Serbian–American film director and multidisciplinary artist based in New York and Belgrade.

== Early life and education ==
Todorović was born in Belgrade in 1979. He studied film at Columbia College Chicago in 1999 and earned a degree in film and television directing at the Faculty of Dramatic Arts in Belgrade. He also earned a MFA in film directing from the same institution. He joined the Directors Guild of America in 2018.

== Career ==
=== Film ===
Todorović directed and co-wrote The Belgrade Phantom (2009), which recounts the story of Vlada Vasiljević, who drove a stolen Porsche through Belgrade and evaded the police over a series of nights in 1979. The film combines interviews with witnesses and police officers with dramatic reconstructions. Reviewing it for Politika, Dubravka Lakić praised the car-chase sequences and technical execution, while noting that it offered little new insight into Vasiljević's personality or motives.

His short documentary Juvenile follows daily life in a Serbian correctional institution for young offenders. Todorović and a small crew filmed at the institution over the course of a year. In a review for Short of the Week, Rob Munday discussed the film's observational approach and the contrast between its documentary subject and carefully composed images. A feature-length project of the same name was presented at the Docs in Progress programme of the Karlovy Vary International Film Festival in 2018.

=== Music videos and advertising ===
In 2017, Todorović directed the video for SOHN's "Hard Liquor". The black-and-white video uses contrasts of light and shadow. He later directed Jessie Ware's "Spotlight" (2020), filmed aboard Tito's Blue Train in Belgrade.

For Paul Kalkbrenner's "Schwer" (2023), Todorović used volumetric video capture to place digitally recorded people in everyday settings. The scenes become increasingly incongruous as the video progresses. His video for Inhaler's "Your House" (2024) follows a woman carrying a briefcase through New York, intercut with scenes of the band's singer, Elijah Hewson, apparently trapped inside it.

Todorović has also directed advertising, including an Adidas campaign released in 2018 that featured women training and competing in several sports.

== Music ==
Todorović and Ilya Duna collaborate as ZNTNDR. Todorović directed the project's video for "Untitled Us" (2022), which follows a young man's relationships and experiences in Tokyo. The video received two nominations at the 2022 UK Music Video Awards.

== Recognition ==
- 2019: Hate Couture won gold in Social Media and silver in Fashion & Beauty at the Clio Awards.
- 2020: Bacardi Beat Machine won the Grand Prix and Creative Innovation awards at the YouTube Works Awards.
- 2022: "Untitled Us" was shortlisted for Best Alternative Video – International and Best Cinematography at the UK Music Video Awards.

== Selected filmography ==
=== Documentaries and short films ===
- The Belgrade Phantom (2009), feature documentary; shown at IDFA and screened at the Centre Pompidou's Hors Pistes programme in 2011.
- Juvenile (2016), short documentary for Dazed.
- You're Dead, America (2017), Motionpoems short film featured on Nowness.

=== Music videos ===
- SOHN – "Hard Liquor" (2017).
- ZNTNDR – "Untitled Us" (2022); shortlisted at the UK Music Video Awards.
- ZNTNDR – "Wonderful Time" (2022).
- Paul Kalkbrenner – "Schwer" (2023).
- Inhaler – "Your House" (2024).

=== Commercials and branded films ===
- Diesel – "Hate Couture" (2018).
- Adidas – "See My Creativity" (2018).
- Nike Japan – "The Future Isn't Waiting" (2020).
- Tissot – "Focus Forward" (2023).
- Experience Abu Dhabi – "Find Your Pace" (2024), filmed on 65 mm film.
- General Motors – "Crafting the One / See You on the Road" (2025).
