= Shunsuke Managi =

Japanese economist

- Born: 1975 (age 50–51)
- Education: University of Rhode Island (Economics); Kyushu University, Japan. (Engineering)
- Occupations: Professor at Kyushu University, Japan.

Shunsuke Managi is the Distinguished Professor of Technology and Policy and the Director of the Urban Institute at Kyushu University, Japan.

== Career ==
Managi has been awarded national research grants on urbanization, transportation, energy, climate change, sustainability, and population change. He is most well known as a director for Inclusive Wealth Report 2018 (IWR 2018) in relation to Natural capital accounting. He is an editor of Economics of Disasters and Climate Change, Environmental Economics and Policy Studies, and Resource and Energy Economics and a lead author for the Intergovernmental Panel on Climate Change and a coordinating lead author for the Intergovernmental Science-Policy Platform on Biodiversity and Ecosystem Services.

Managi is the author of Technology, Natural Resources and Economic Growth: Improving the Environment for a Greener Future, published by Edward Elgar Publishing Ltd, and is editor of The Routledge Handbook of Environmental Economics in Asia. He is the co-chair the Scientific Committee of the 2018 World Congress of Environmental and Resource Economists jointly organized by Association of Environmental and Resource Economists, European Association of Environmental and Resource Economists and East Asian Association of Environmental and Resource Economics.

== Selected publications ==
- Wealth, Inclusive Growth and Sustainability Routledge, New York, 2019.
- Japan’s Quest for Nuclear Energy and the Price It Paid: Accidents, Consequences, and Lessons Learned for the Global Nuclear Industry (with Behling, N., T. Behling, M. Williams), Elsevier, New York, 2019.
- Inclusive Wealth Report 2018: Measuring Progress toward Sustainability (with P. Kumar), Routledge, New York, 2018.
- "The Wealth of Nations and Regions" Routledge, New York, 2016.
- "Environmental Economics" (with K. Kuriyama) Routledge, New York, 2016.
- "The Economics of Green Growth -New Indicators for Sustainable Societies" Routledge, New York, 2015.
- "Handbook of Environmental Economics in Asia" Routledge, New York, 2015. Cited in Environmental issues in China
- "The Economics of Biodiversity and Ecosystem Services" Routledge, New York, 2012.
- "Technology, Natural Resources and Economic Growth: Improving the Environment for a Greener Future" Edward Elgar Publishing Ltd, 2011.
- "Waste and Recycling" (with T. Shinkuma), Routledge, New York, 2011.
- "Chinese Economic Development and Environment" (S. Kaneko), Edward Elgar Publishing Ltd, 2010.
- "The Economics of Sustainable Development: The Case of India" (S. Kumar), Springer-Verlag, New York, 2009.
- "Technological Change and Environmental Policy: A Study of Depletion in the Oil and Gas Industry" Edward Elgar Publishing Ltd, 2008.
