= Prashant V. Kamat =

Physical chemist

- Born: India
- Occupations: John A. Zahm Professor of Science, University of Notre Dame
- Known for: Light Energy Conversion

Prashant V. Kamat is a professor of chemistry and biochemistry and a principal scientist of the radiation laboratory, University of Notre Dame. He is affiliated with the department of chemical and biomolecular engineering as a concurrent professor. He earned his master's (1974) and doctoral degree (1979) in physical chemistry from Bombay University, and carried out his postdoctoral research at Boston University (1979–1981) and University of Texas at Austin (1981–1983).

== Research career ==
Prashant Kamat has made significant research contributions to physical chemistry and material science, seeking to utilize nanomaterials and nanomaterial heterostructures for light energy conversion. Recently his research efforts have focused heavily on Quantum dot solar cell development. He has published more than 450 peer-reviewed journal papers, review articles and book chapters. He has edited two books in the area of nanoscale materials. These publications have been widely cited in the scientific community, giving Dr. Kamat nearly 100000 citations and an h-index of 160. He is the first editor in chief of ACS Energy Letters. He was a fellow of Japan Society for Promotion of Science during 1997 and 2003 and was presented 2006 Honda-Fujishima Lectureship award by the Japan Photochemical Society. In 2008 he became a Fellow of the Electrochemical Society, and in 2011 he received the CRSI medal by the Chemical Research Society of India. In 2013 he was awarded the Langmuir Lectureship award. In 2011 he was #59 on the list of the Top 100 Chemists, 2000-2010 by Thomson Reuters with an impact (citations per paper) of 64.91. He was listed among the world's most cited materials scientists by Elsevier Scopus in 2016. He is a Fellow of the Electrochemical Society, American Association for the Advancement of Science, and the American Chemical Society.

== Recent publications ==
- doi:10.1021/acs.accounts.6b00528 Semiconductor Surface Chemistry as Holy Grail in Photocatalysis and Photovoltaics Accounts of Chemical Research, 2017, 50 (3), pp 527–531
- doi:10.1021/acs.jpcc.7b05207 Revival of Solar Paint Concept: Air-Processable Solar Paints for the Fabrication of Quantum Dot-Sensitized Solar Cells The Journal of Physical Chemistry C 2017, 121 (33), pp 17658–17670
- doi:10.1021/acsami.6b14604 AgInS_{2}–ZnS Quantum Dots: Excited State Interactions with TiO_{2} and Photovoltaic Performance ACS Applied Materials & Interfaces, 2017, 9 (39), pp 33379–33388
- doi:10.1021/acs.chemmater.7b03751 CsPbBr_{3} Solar Cells: Controlled Film Growth through Layer-by-Layer Quantum Dot Deposition Chemistry of Materials, 2017, ASAP
- doi:10.1021/acsami.7b07893 Quantum Dot Light-Emitting Devices: Beyond Alignment of Energy Levels ACS Applied Materials & Interfaces 2017, 9 (36), pp 30741–30745
- doi:10.1021/am405196u Recent Advances in Quantum Dot Surface Chemistry ACS Applied Materials & Interfaces, 2014 ASAP.
- doi:10.1021/ja411014k An Inorganic Hole Conductor for Organo-Lead Halide Perovskite Solar Cells. Improved Hole Conductivity with Copper Iodide Journal of the American Chemical Society, 2014 136 (2) 758–764.
- doi:10.1021/ja403807f Metal-Cluster-Sensitized Solar Cells. A New Class of Thiolated Gold Sensitizers Delivering Efficiency Greater Than 2% Journal of the American Chemical Society, 2013 135 (24) 8822–8825.
- doi:10.1021/nn401794k Making Graphene Holey. Gold-Nanoparticle-Mediated Hydroxyl Radical Attack on Reduced Graphene Oxide ACS Nano, 2013 7 (6) 5546–5557.
- doi:10.1021/jz400052e Quantum Dot Solar Cells. The Next Big Thing in Photovoltaics Journal of Physical Chemistry Letters, 2013 4 (6) 908–918.
- doi:10.1021/ar300248f Graphitic Design: Prospects of Graphene-Based Nanocomposites for Solar Energy Conversion, Storage, and Sensing Accounts of Chemical Research, 2013 46 (10) 2235–2243.
