= Radiation Measurement =

Radiation Measurement may refer to:

- Ionizing radiation#Measurement
- Radiometry, a set of techniques for measuring electromagnetic radiation of any wavelength
- Radiation Measurements (journal), a peer-reviewed academic journal
