= Andreas Löschel =

German economist

Andreas Löschen (2026)

Andreas Löschel is a German economist currently holding the chair of Energy and Resource Economics at the University of Münster. He is the director of the Centre of Applied Economic Research Münster (CEAW). His research interests include applied microeconomics, energy economics and the economics of climate change. He is ranked among the most influential economists in his field. In an annual Frankfurter Allgemeine Zeitung Ranking, he is among the 25 most influential economists in Germany (2013, 2014, 2017).

== Education ==
Löschel studied Economics at the University of Erlangen–Nuremberg and Wayne State University. In 2003, he obtained a doctorate from the University of Mannheim. He subsequently completed his habilitation in 2009 at the University of Oldenburg.

== Career ==
Löschel is an advisor to Aurora Energy Research Limited. Since 2005, Löschel has been a Senior Researcher at the Centre for European Economic Research, where he has also held the position of the Director of the Environmental and Resource Economics Department between 2007 and 2014. From 2010 to 2014, he was a Professor for Economics focusing on Environmental and Resource Economics at the University of Heidelberg. Since 2011, he has chaired the Energy Expert Commission on the monitoring process Energie der Zukunft (Energy of the future) project of the German federal government. In 2017, he was furthermore elected as a member of the German National Academy of Science and Technology. Löschel is also Chairman of the Board of Directors of the Academies' Initiative "ESYS –Energiesysteme der Zukunft" (Energy systems of the future), led by acatech, and part of the Research Platform Energiewende of the Federal Ministry of Education and Research. Löschel is a lead author of the Working Group III contribution to the IPCC Fifth Assessment Report (2010-2014).

== Research ==
Löschel was a visiting scholar at the Massachusetts Institute of Technology (MIT) (2003), Stanford University (2005), ANU (2010, 2011), Tsinghua University Beijing (2013) and the University of Oxford (2017). Since 2014, he has been a visiting professor at the University of International Business and Economics Beijing.

His research interests include applied microeconomics, energy economics and the economics of climate change. Löschel's publications have been extensively cited.

== Other activities ==
In 2007, Löschel was a member of the European Commission’s delegation to the United Nations Climate Change Conference in Bali. He also participated in the subsequent conferences in Posznan (2008), Copenhagen (2009), Durban (2011), Warsaw (2013) and Lima (2014).

Since 2017, Löschel has been serving on the Scientific Commission of the State of Lower Saxony, under Minister-President Stephan Weil.

=== Non-profit organizations ===
- Münster Electrochemical Energy Technology at the University of Münster, Member of the Advisory Board (since 2016)
- Episcopal Conference of Germany, Member of the Working Group on Ecological Affairs (since 2013)
- German Institute for Economic Research (DIW), Member of the Scientific Advisory Board

=== Editorial boards ===
- The Energy Journal, Member of the Editorial Board (since 2017)
- Climate Policy, Member of the Editorial Board (since 2016)
- Verein für Socialpolitik, Member of the Committee on Environmental Economics

== Selected publications ==
- Revealed preferences for voluntary climate change mitigation when the purely individual perspective is relaxed – evidence from a framed field experiment (with B. Sturm and R. Uehleke), Journal of Behavioral and Experimental Economics, 67, 149-160, 2017.
- Kesternich, M., A. Löschel and D.Römer, The long-term impact of matching and rebate subsidies when public goods are impure: Field experimental evidence from the carbon offsetting market, Journal of Public Economics, 137, 70-78, 2016.
- Löschel, A., G.Erdmann, F.Staiss, H.-J. Ziesing, Report of the Energy Expert Commission to Monitor the Energy Transformation in Germany on the Fifth Monitoring Report of the German Government, 2015.
- Löschel, A., G.Erdmann, F.Staiss, H.-J. Ziesing, Report of the Energy Expert Commission to Monitor the Energy Transformation in Germany on the Fourth Monitoring Report of the German Government, 2015.
- A. Löschel, D. Rübbelke: The voluntary provision of international public goods – an overview, Economica, 81(322), 195-204, 2014.
- F. Jotzo and A. Löschel, The rise of emissions trading in Asia, Editor of the Special Issue of Energy Policy 75, 2014.
- Assessing Transformation Pathways (with L. Clarke, K. Jiang, K. Akimoto, M. Babiker, G. Blanford, K. Fisher-Vanden, J.-C. Hourcade, V. Krey, E. Kriegler, D. McCollum, S.Paltsev, S.Rose, P.R. Shukla, M. Tavoni, B.C.C. van der Zwaan, and D.P. van Vuuren), in Edenhofer, O., R. Pichs-Madruga, Y.Sokona, E. Farahani, S. Kadner, K. Seyboth, A. Adler, I. Baum, S. Brunner, P. Eickemeier, B. Kriemann, J. Savolainen, S. Schlömer, C. von Stechow, T. Zwickel and J.C. Minx (eds.): Climate Change 2014: Mitigation of Climate Change. Contribution of Working Group III to the Fifth Assessment Report of the Intergovernmental Panel on Climate change, Cambridge University Press, Cambridge, 2014.
- A. Löschel, B. Sturm and C. Vogt, The Demand for Climate Protection - Empirical Evidence from Germany, Economics Letters, 118(3), 415-418, 2013.
- Tavoni, A., A. Dannenberg and G. Kallis, Inequality, Communication and the Avoidance of Disastrous Climate Change, Proceedings of the National Academy of Sciences, 108(29), 11825-11829,2011.
- Lange, A., Löschel, C. Vogt and A. Ziegler, On the Self-interested Use of Equity in International Climate Negotiations, European Economic Review, 5(3), 359-375, 2010.
- Böhringer, C., A. Löschel and T.F. Rutherford, Decomposing Integrated Assessment of Climate Change: Methodology and Sample Application, Journal of Economic Dynamics and Control, 31(2), 683-702, 2007.
- Löschel, A., Technological Change in Economic Models of Environmental Policy: A Survey, Ecological Economics, 43(2-3), 105-126, 2002.
- Technological Change in Economic Models of Environmental Policy: A Survey, Ecological Economics, 43(2-3), 105-126, 2002.
