= Institute for Nuclear Research (NASU) =

Soviet-Ukrainian research institute

NASU Institute for Nuclear Research
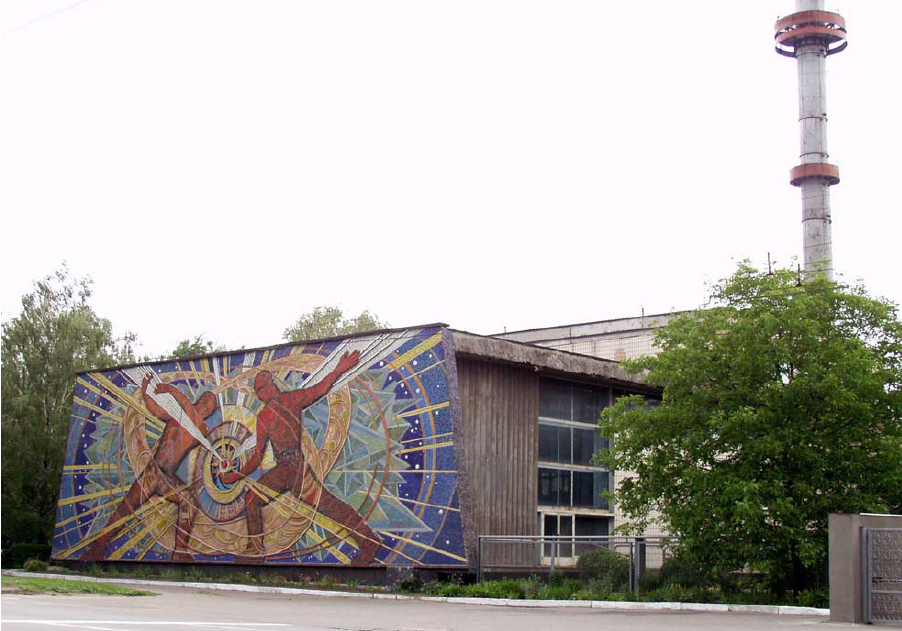
- Established: 1970
- Director: Vasyl Ivanovych Slisenko
- Location: Prospekt Nauky, 47, MSP 03680 Kyiv, Ukraine; 50.38654°N 30.53165°E
- Operating agency: National Academy of Sciences of Ukraine
- Website: www.kinr.kiev.ua

Institute for Nuclear Research of the National Academy of Sciences of Ukraine (KINR) (Ukrainian: Інститут ядерних досліджень Національної академії наук України, romanized: Instytut yadernykh doslidzhen Natsionalnoi akademii nauk Ukrainy) is a research institute located in Kyiv, Ukraine. The Institute publishes the journal Nuclear Physics and Atomic Energy.

== History ==
Soon after the World War II, in 1944 at the Institute of Physics in Kyiv was created a department for dealing with number of issues concerning nuclear physics and use atomic energy. For execution of outlined activities sequentially were placed into operation: in 1956 a cyclotron U-120, in 1960 a research reactor VVR-M (Water-Water), and in 1964 an electro-static generator EGP-5.

On 26 March 1970 the Presidium of the National Academy of Sciences of Ukraine (at that time Ukrainian Academy of Sciences) in pursuance of the relevant resolution of the Council of Ministers of the Ukrainian SSR adopted the resolution #105 about the creation of NASU Institute of Nuclear Research (IYaD) on the basis of a number of nuclear departments of the NASU Institute of Physics. It is guarded by the 22nd National Guard Brigade.

After the accident at the Chernobyl NPP, the Institute of Nuclear Research took an active part in combating the consequences. The level of radioactive contamination of the environment in the regions of Ukraine was established, numerous devices for monitoring the migration of radionuclides in the environment were developed and manufactured. The Institute also systematically checked the condition of the fuel-containing masses of the Shelter facility, which significantly contributed to mitigating the consequences of the Chernobyl disaster.

== Major scientific directions ==
The main directions of scientific research are Nuclear Physics, Atomic Energy, Solid-state physics, Plasma Physics, Radiobiology and Radioecology.

== Experimental facilities ==
Research Nuclear reactor WWR-M, Cyclotron U-120, Isochronous cyclotron U-240, 10 MeV Electrostatic Tandem Accelerator.

== Directors ==
- 1970–1974 Mitrofan Pasichnyk;
- 1974–1983 Oleh Nimets;
- 1984–2015 Ivan Vyshnevskyi;
- 2015– Vasyl Slisenko.

== Known scientists ==
- Aleksandr Leipunskii;
- Vilen Strutinsky;
- Kostyantyn O. Terenetsky;
- Yuri G. Zdesenko.
