= Yuri G. Zdesenko =

Ukrainian nuclear physicist

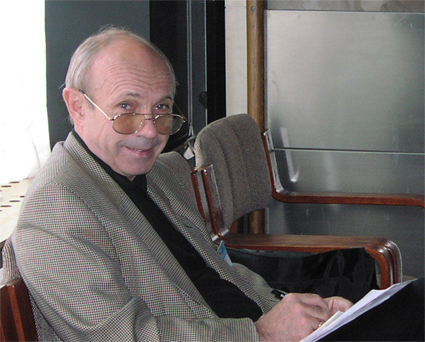
- Born: 6 October 1943; Dmytrivka, Bakhmach Raion, Chernihiv Oblast, Ukraine
- Died: 1 September 2004 (aged 60); Kyiv, Ukraine
- Education: Taras Shevchenko National University of Kyiv
- Known for: Double beta decay
- Awards: the State prize of Ukraine in science and technology 2016 (posthumously)
- Scientific career
- Fields: Nuclear physics, Astroparticle physics
- Workplaces: Taras Shevchenko National University of Kyiv; Institute of Geochemistry and Physics of Minerals; Institute for Nuclear Research of NASU

Yuri G. Zdesenko (Ukrainian: Здесенко Юрій Георгійович); 6 October 1943 – 1 September 2004, was a Ukrainian nuclear physicist known for a significant contribution to investigations of double beta decay.

== Early life ==
Yuri G. Zdesenko was born on 6 October 1943 in Dmytrivka, Bakhmach Raion, Chernihiv Oblast, Ukrainian Soviet Socialist Republic of the Soviet Union to Soviet Army officer Georgy Zdesenko.

== Academic career ==
In 1970 Zdesenko was graduated from the Department of Physics of the T.G.Shevchenko Kyiv State University. He obtained degrees of Candidate of Sciences (Philosophy Doctor) in 1981 (Institute for Nuclear Research, Moscow, Soviet Union), Doktor nauk in 1990 (Institute for Nuclear Research, Kyiv, Ukrainian Soviet Socialist Republic) and the academic rank of Full Professor in 2000 (Institute for Nuclear Research, Kyiv, Ukraine). Taking into account his outstanding scientific achievements, Zdesnko was elected in 2003 a Corresponding Member of the National Academy of Sciences of Ukraine.

== Research ==
Zdesenko started researches in the Laboratory of Nuclear Physics of the T.G. Shevchenko Kyiv State University (1970–1971) and then in the Institute of Geochemistry and Physics of Minerals (1971–1980) where he dealt with neutron activation analysis of minerals and radiocarbon dating. At that time he became interested in double beta decay of atomic nuclei.

In 1980 he created the Laboratory for Low Background Measurements of the Special Construction Technological Center of the Institute for Nuclear Research of the Ukrainian Academy of Sciences (1980–1986) where searches for the double beta decay of ^{130}Te, ^{96}Zr and ^{100}Mo were realized. In 1986 the laboratory was transformed to the Lepton Physics Department of the Institute for Nuclear Research (Kyiv, Ukraine).

In the early 1980s Zdesenko, supported by Bruno Pontecorvo (who was at that time head of the neutrino council of the Soviet Academy of Sciences),

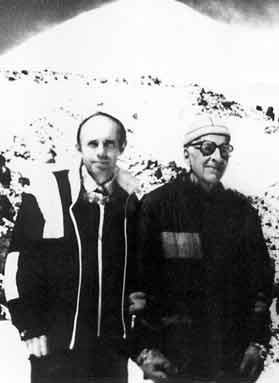
Yuri G. Zdesenko with Bruno Pontecorvo on the background of the Elbrus mountain, Baksan valley, Russia, 1987

initiated construction of the Solotvina Underground Laboratory in Solotvina, in Zakarpattia Oblast on the west of Ukraine. The Laboratory was located in a salt mine at a depth of 430 m. Low counting experiments were started in the Solotvina laboratory in 1984. Investigations of rare nuclear alpha and beta decays, searches for neutrinoless double beta decay of atomic nuclei were performed in the laboratory. The most valuable results obtained in the Solotvina Underground Laboratory are as following:

1. the most stringent limits on neutrinoless double beta decay of ^{116}Cd obtained with the help of cadmium tungstate crystal scintillators enriched in isotope ^{116}Cd at 83%. One of the most stringent limits on the effective Majorana neutrino mass was derived from the experiments;
2. observation of the two neutrino double beta decay of ^{116}Cd;
3. first observation of the alpha activity of tungsten (isotope ^{180}W);
4. investigation of rare beta decay of ^{113}Cd;
5. search for neutrinoless double beta decay of ^{160}Gd and ^{186}W.
6. development of low background technique for low counting experiments, in particular, the cadmium tungstate crystal scintillators from enriched isotope cadmium 116

Zdesenko and his group have also contributed to searches for hypothetical decays beyond the Standard Model: decays of nucleons into invisible channels, decays of electron with non-conservation of the electric charge, charge-non-conserving β decays. Yuri G. Zdesenko is author or coauthor of above 300 scientific publications for which there are more than 1500 references in papers of other authors.
