= List of power station types =

A map of the world's power plants, April 2026

This is a list of power station types.

== Types of power stations ==
- Biogas power station
- Biomass power station
- Coal-fired power station
- Combined cycle power plant
- Concentrated solar power station
- Diesel power station
- Reciprocating engine power plant
- Floating solar
- Fuel cell power plant
- Gas turbine power plant
- Geothermal power station
- Hydroelectric power station
- Hydrogen fuel cell power plant
- Natural gas-fired power station
- Nuclear power plant
- Oil-fired power station
- Photovoltaic power station
- Pumped-storage power station
- Tidal power
- Waste-to-energy plant
- Wave power
- Wind farm and offshore wind farm

== See also ==
- Comparison of fuel cell types
- floating nuclear power plant
- List of energy storage systems
- List of largest power stations in the world
- List of renewable energy journals
- List of renewable energy technologies
- Methanol economy
- Osmotic power
- Small modular reactor
