= 22nd Foreign Diplomatic Missions Protection Brigade =

- 22-га окрема бригада НГ (Ukrainian)
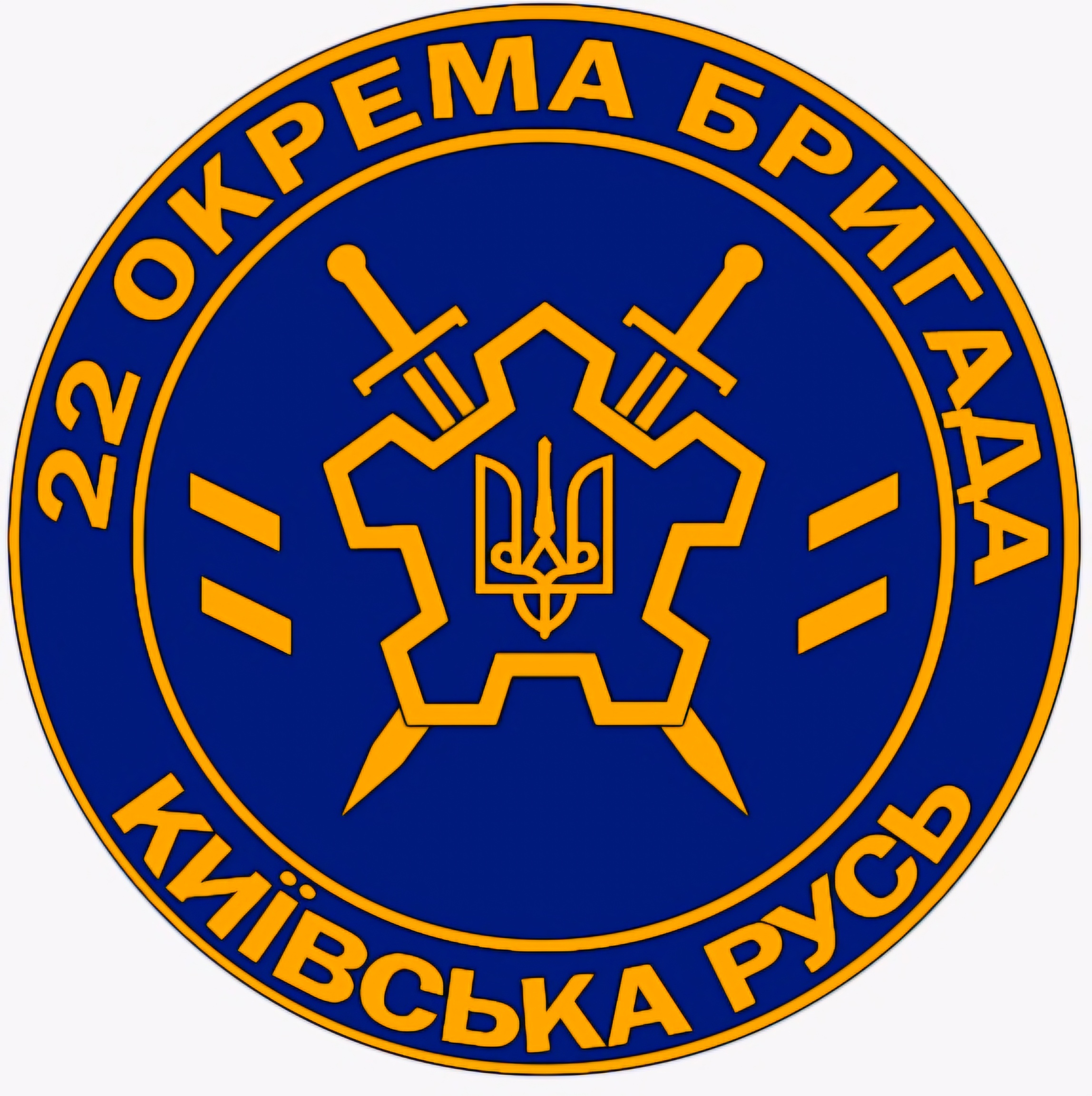
- Brigade Insignia
- Founded: 1992
- Country: Ukraine
- Allegiance: Ministry of Internal Affairs
- Branch: National Guard of Ukraine
- Type: Brigade
- Role: Protection of Diplomatic Institutions
- Part of: National Guard of Ukraine
- Garrison/HQ: Kyiv
- Nickname: Kyivan Rus Brigade
- Engagements: Russo-Ukrainian war: War in Donbas; Russian invasion of Ukraine

Commanders
- Current commander: Colonel Maksym Eduardovych Masnyi

Insignia
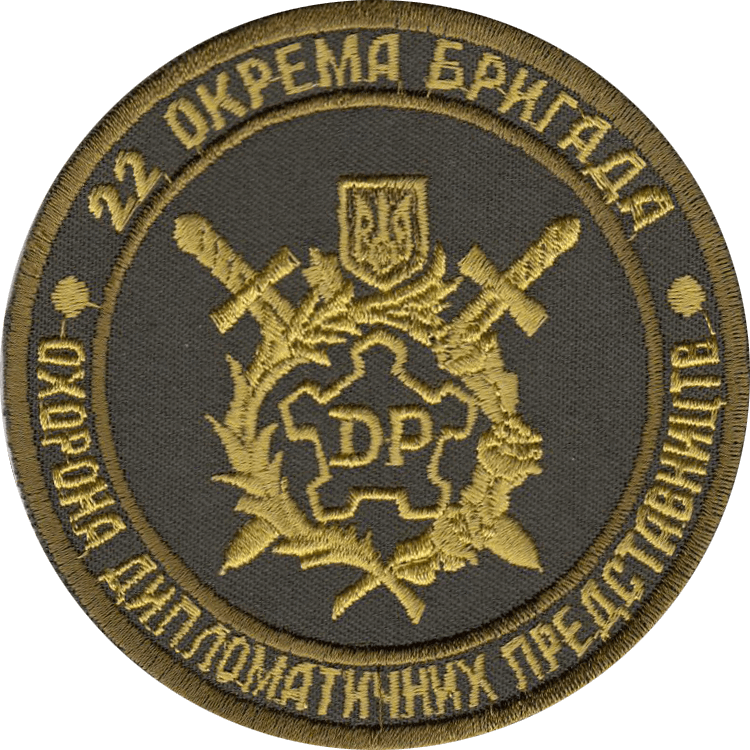
- Field Insignia

The 22nd Foreign Diplomatic Missions Protection "Kyivan Rus" Brigade is a Brigade of the National Guard of Ukraine, tasked with the protection of the Foreign Diplomatic Institutions in Ukraine as well as the Institute for Nuclear Research (NASU). It was established in 1992 as a separate Battalion. In addition to protection of foreign diplomatic missions, it has also seen combat operations during the War in Donbass and the Russian invasion of Ukraine.

== History ==
It was established as a separate battalion on 22 June 1992, as part of the 1st Kyiv Division. On the same day, the battalion took its first duty to guard the residence of Roman Popadiuk, the United States Ambassador to Ukraine.

On 1 July 1995, the battalion was expanded to the 22nd Separate Brigade for the protection of Diplomatic and Consular Missions of Foreign countries and in addition to units that performed security functions, it also included a school of ensigns. In 2000, after the disbandment of the National Guard of Ukraine, the brigade was transferred to the Internal Troops of Ukraine, subordinated to the direct command. In 2012, the brigade was transferred to the Northern Territorial Command. In 2014, the brigade became part of the newly established National Guard of Ukraine, again as a directly subordinated brigade.

On 1 February 2014, an embassy staffer's car of the Embassy of Canada, Kyiv was torched after she attended anti-government rallies. On 18 February 2014, the Canadian embassy in Kyiv was allegedly attacked by "a group of unidentified persons armed with sticks". Soon the authorities' forces including the personnel of the 22nd Brigade stormed a camp of activists outside the Embassy of Canada, Kyiv which triggered clashes that killed at least 26 people. During early March 2014, demonstrations were held outside the Russian embassy in Kyiv in response to a Russian intervention in Crimea. On 15 May 2014, Ukrainian activists held a protest against France's delivery of two Mistral helicopter carriers to Russia at the French embassy in Kyiv. After the start of the War in Donbass, the battalion's special purpose guard company participated in combat missions in the ATO zone, multiple tasks were performed by the BTR-80s of the battalion who provided transportation and combat work of the soldiers of the other units of the National Guard of Ukraine and the Security Service of Ukraine. The servicemen of the battalion's special purpose company carried out duties at checkpoints, in active offensive actions especially during the Siege of Sloviansk and the Battle of Sievierodonetsk and in conducting operational, preventive and stabilization operations. During the Siege of Sloviansk, a BTR-80 of the brigade, during an engagement near Mount Karachun, rescued a besieged group of soldiers of the Security Service of Ukraine, under fire from grenade launchers, the BTR-80 managed to break through two separatist checkpoints and reached the besieged troops and carried the soldiers back to the positions of Joint Forces Operation. On 3 June 2014, the brigade's troops performed an operation to destroy a separatist stronghold in Semenivka, on the outskirts of Sloviansk. On 14 June 2014 between 200 and 300 protesters overturned several cars of embassy staff and replaced the Russian flag with the flag of the Ukrainian Insurgent Army in protest against Russian governmental involvement in the 2014 pro-Russian unrest in Ukraine.

On 8 June 2017, an explosion "using a small incendiary device" took place in the Embassy of the United States, Kyiv, but did not result in property damage or casualties.

Since March 2022, the personnel of the brigade performed combat operations during the Battle of Moschun and performed tasks at checkpoints in Kyiv Oblast. During 2022, 350 Royal Marines from 45 Commando were deployed to protect the Embassy of the United Kingdom, Kyiv, in addition to the personnel of the 22nd Brigade. On 29 September 2023, the brigade was awarded the honorary name "Kyivan Rus".

== Roles ==
- Protection of diplomatic missions and consular institutions of foreign countries and their personnel, as well as state authorities.
- Protection of Institute for Nuclear Research (NASU)

Currently, servicemen of the 22nd brigade ensure the Protection of about 100 embassies, consular institutions, residences, international organizations and state authorities located in Kyiv.

== Structure ==
The structure of the Brigade is as follows:

- 22nd Foreign Diplomatic Missions Protection Brigade
  - HHC
  - 1st Guard Battalion
  - 2nd Guard Battalion
  - 3rd Guard Battalion
  - Special Purpose Guards Company
  - Automobile Company
  - Special Commandant's Office
  - Communications Node
  - MP Platoon
  - Military Band

== Commanders ==
- Colonel Maksym Eduardovych Masnyi (October 2023-)
