= List of plasma physics software =

List of software used in plasma physics and magnetohydrodynamics simulations

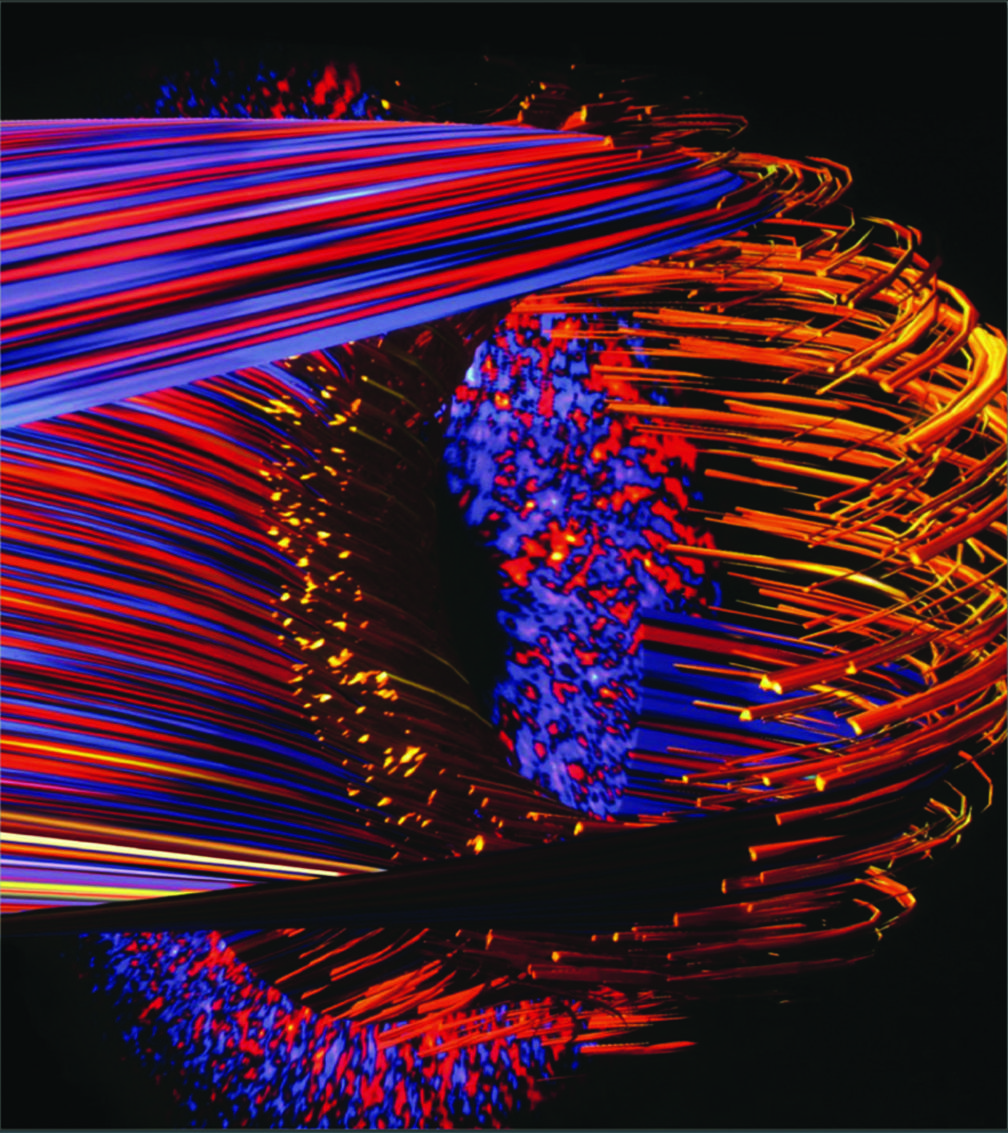
Particle-in-cell simulation image

This is a list of plasma physics software, including programs and tools used for simulating, modeling, and analyzing plasma behavior, magnetohydrodynamics (MHD), and related phenomena. These software packages are used in research, fusion power studies, and plasma engineering.

== Simulation and modeling ==
Software, tool	Note, reference	License
BOUT++	3D plasma fluid simulation code used for edge-localized mode (ELM) and turbulence studies in tokamaks.	Open source
FLASH	Adaptive mesh refinement code for simulating compressible plasmas and astrophysical flows.	Proprietary
Gkeyll	Continuum kinetic simulation framework for plasma physics and fusion applications. Supports gyrokinetic, Vlasov, and fluid models.	Open source

== Particle-in-cell (PIC) codes ==
Software, tool	Note, reference	License
EPOCH	PIC code for high-intensity laser-plasma interactions.	Open source
LSP	Particle-in-cell and hybrid plasma simulation code.	Proprietary
Magic	PIC software used for plasma simulations	Proprietary
OSIRIS	Highly optimized, fully relativistic, electromagnetic PIC code for plasma and laser-plasma simulations.	Open source
Starfish	Particle-in-cell plasma simulation code.	Proprietary
VPIC	Vector Particle-In-Cell code designed for large-scale plasma simulations on supercomputers	Proprietary
VSim	Particle-in-cell and electromagnetic plasma simulation software.	Proprietary

== Plasma physics modeling codes ==
Software, tool	Note, reference	License
CFD-ACE+	Multiphysics computational software including plasma simulations.	Proprietary
COMSOL	General multiphysics simulation platform with plasma modules.	Proprietary
PLASIMO	Multi-physics plasma simulation platform for modeling plasmas with different degrees of equilibrium, supporting fluid, hybrid, and kinetic models for a wide range of research and industrial applications.	Proprietary
Quantemol-VT	Commercial plasma modeling software for molecular and quantum plasma simulations.	Proprietary
STAR-CCM+	Multiphysics simulation platform including plasma modeling modules.	Proprietary
USim	Commercial plasma and multiphysics modeling software	Proprietary
VizGlow	Commercial software for modeling thermal plasmas and plasma-material interactions.	Proprietary
VizSpark	Thermal plasma modeling software for industrial and research applications.	Proprietary

== Magnetohydrodynamics (MHD) software ==
Software, tool	Note, reference	License
ATHENA++	High-order Godunov code for astrophysical MHD simulations.	Open source
M3D-C1	Extended MHD code for simulating tokamak plasmas, including stability and transport analysis.	Proprietary
NIMROD	Nonlinear MHD code for modeling magnetically confined plasmas, including tokamak disruptions.	Proprietary
EOF-Library	Energy-conserving orbit-following library for kinetic plasma simulations, designed for coupling energetic particle dynamics to MHD and hybrid models.	Open source
PLUTO	Modular code for astrophysical and laboratory plasma simulations with MHD, relativistic, and multi-fluid capabilities.	Open source
VAC	General-purpose MHD code for astrophysics and laboratory plasmas.	Proprietary

== Data analysis and visualization ==
Software, tool	Note, reference	License
Matplotlib	Python library commonly used for plotting and analyzing simulation results.	Open source
ParaView	Multi-platform data analysis and visualization application suitable for plasma physics datasets.	Open source
VisIt	Visualization tool for 2D and 3D plasma simulation data.	Open source

== Experimental and diagnostic tools ==
Software, tool	Note, reference	License
ADAS	Database and software for analyzing plasma spectroscopy.	Proprietary
SOLPS-ITER	Software for simulating plasma transport in the edge and scrape-off layer of tokamaks	Proprietary
TRANSP	Transport code for analyzing experimental tokamak plasmas.	Proprietary

== See also ==
- Accelerator physics codes
- List of computational physics software
- List of computational fluid dynamics software
- List of computational chemistry software
- List of computational materials science software
- List of computer simulation software
- List of fusion experiments
- List of fusion power technologies
- List of nuclear science journals
- Tokamak
- Inertial confinement fusion
- ITER
- Nuclear fusion reactor

=== Plasma physics research institutes and programs ===
- Laboratory for Atmospheric and Space Physics – United States
- MIT Plasma Science and Fusion Center – United States
- Princeton Plasma Physics Laboratory – United States
- Max Planck Institute for Plasma Physics – Germany
- Institute for Plasma Research – India
- Instituto de Plasmas e Fusão Nuclear – Portugal
