= Branislav Todorović =

Serbian mechanical engineer and academic

Branislav B. Todorović
- Бранислав Б. Тодоровић
- Born: 7 January 1931; Belgrade, Kingdom of Yugoslavia
- Died: 30 December 2025 (aged 94)
- Education: University of Belgrade
- Known for: Research in HVAC and building thermodynamics
- Spouse: Marija Todorović
- Children: Borislav Todorović, Natalija Todorović-Shaw, Jovan Todorović
- Scientific career
- Fields: Mechanical engineering, HVAC, thermodynamics
- Workplaces: University of Belgrade

Branislav B. Todorović (Serbian Cyrillic: Бранислав Б. Тодоровић; 7 January 1931 – 30 December 2025) was a Serbian mechanical engineer and academic whose work focused on HVAC and building thermodynamics. He was a professor at the Faculty of Mechanical Engineering, University of Belgrade. Todorović served as editor-in-chief of the journal Energy and Buildings.

== Academic career ==
After completing his undergraduate studies, Todorović worked as a thermotechnical design engineer from 1960 to 1963. He subsequently joined the Faculty of Mechanical Engineering, University of Belgrade, where he advanced through academic ranks and was appointed full professor in 1979.

Todorović held visiting academic appointments at institutions including the Technical University of Vienna, the University of California, Berkeley, California State University, San Jose, and the University of Kansas. He also served as a permanent visiting professor at Southeast University in Nanjing, China.

As a Fulbright Visiting Scholar during 1985–1986, he lectured and conducted research at the University of California, Berkeley.

== Research ==
Todorović’s research focused on transient heat transfer in buildings, thermal behavior of building envelopes, heating and cooling load modeling, solar radiation effects, and energy efficiency. He developed mathematical models for thermal load calculations that incorporated heat storage in building structures and the effects of shading over time.

His work also addressed topics such as double-skin façades, water–air heat exchangers for district heating systems, and long-term development of the building sector. He continued publishing scholarly work into the late 2010s, including research on future trends in the built environment and urban development.

== Awards and honors ==
- Humboldt Research Fellowship (1966)
- Best Paper Award, American Society of Heating, Refrigerating and Air-Conditioning Engineers (1985)
- Fulbright Scholar in the United States (1985–1986)
- John F. James International Award, American Society of Heating, Refrigerating and Air-Conditioning Engineers (1992)
- E. K. Campbell Award of Merit, American Society of Heating, Refrigerating and Air-Conditioning Engineers (2002)
- REHVA Gold Medal (2005)
- Doctor Honoris Causa, Politehnica University of Timișoara (2012)
- Honorary editor of the journal Energy and Buildings (Elsevier) (2017)
- Distinguished 50-Year Member Award, American Society of Heating, Refrigerating and Air-Conditioning Engineers (2023)
- Golden Plaque, American Society of Heating, Refrigerating and Air-Conditioning Engineers
