= USAEE =

United States Association for Energy Economics (USAEE) was founded in 1994 to provide a forum for the exchange of ideas, experience and issues among professionals interested in energy economics. It is the largest affiliate of the International Association for Energy Economics. USAEE has 1000 members from diverse backgrounds - corporate, academic, scientific and government.

The USAEE publishes a newsletter, "Dialogue", an annual salary survey, as well as a "Working Paper Series".

== Conferences ==
The main annual conference for USAEE is the USAEE North American Conference that is organized at diverse locations in North America. In addition, local affiliate chapters hold regular meetings as well as regional conferences. Recent annual conferences have been held in New York City, Anchorage, Alaska, and Calgary, Canada.
