= Instituto de Plasmas e Fusão Nuclear =

Portuguese research institution

Coordinates: 38.7373501°N 9.1410516°W

Instituto de Plasmas e Fusão Nuclear (IPFN) (Institute for Plasmas and Nuclear Fusion) is a research unit of Instituto Superior Técnico (IST), Lisbon, and a leading Portuguese institution in physics research. IPFN has the status of Associate Laboratory in the thematic areas of controlled nuclear fusion, plasma technologies and intense lasers, granted by the Portuguese Foundation for Science and Technology.

IPFN was formally created in January 2008, as a result of the merging between the former research units Center for Nuclear Fusion and Center for Plasma Physics. As of 2015, almost 190 people work at IPFN, of which more than 100 are PhDs.

== Organization ==
IPFN is organized in seven research groups: Engineering and Systems Integration, Experimental Physics, Materials Processing and Characterisation, Theory and Modelling, Lasers and Plasmas, Gas Discharges and Gaseous Electronics, and High Pressure Plasmas. The activities in the frame of the Associate Laboratory are evaluated by an External Evaluation Committee. IPFN is also the research unit of the Contract of Association between EURATOM and IST, in force since 1990. These activities are coordinated by the Head of Research Unit and monitored by a steering committee.

== Main research fields ==
IPFN activities are centered on the following competences:

- Magnetic Confinement Fusion Devices
- Fusion Engineering Systems
- Fusion Theory and Modelling
- Inertial fusion
- Laser-Plasma Accelerators
- High-Performance Computing
- Relativistic Astrophysics
- Novel Radiation Sources
- Ultra Intense Photonics
- Space Physics
- Environmental Plasma Engineering Laboratory
- Kinetics in Plasmas and Afterglows
- Modelling of Plasma Sources
- Quantum Plasmas

== See also ==
- Instituto Superior Técnico
- List of plasma physics software
