= Kirk Schanze =

American chemist

Kirk Sullivan Schanze is an American chemist previously at the University of Florida and currently the professor and Robert A. Welch Distinguished University Chair in Chemistry at the University of Texas at San Antonio and Editor-in-Chief of ACS Applied Materials & Interfaces.
