= ACS Applied Energy Materials =

- Discipline: Chemistry, biochemistry, physics
- Language: English
- Edited by: Kirk S. Schanze

Publication details
- History: 2018–present
- Publisher: American Chemical Society (United States)
- Frequency: Monthly
- Impact factor: 6.4 (2022)

Standard abbreviations
- ISO 4: ACS Appl. Energy Mater.

Indexing
- ISSN: 2574-0962 (print); 2574-0962 (web)
- OCLC no.: 1022087790

Links
- Journal homepage

ACS Applied Energy Materials is a monthly peer-reviewed scientific journal that was established in 2018 by the American Chemical Society. It covers aspects of materials, engineering, chemistry, physics, and biology relevant to sustainable applications in energy conversion and storage. The editor in chief is Kirk S. Schanze. According to the Journal Citation Reports, the journal has a 2022 impact factor of 6.4.

== Scope ==
ACS Applied Energy Materials publishes letters, articles, reviews, spotlight on application, forum articles, and comments across a given subject area. Specific materials of interest will include, but are not limited to:

- Fuel cell
- Supercapacitor
- Thermoelectrics
- Photovoltaics
- Photo-electrosynthesis cells

== See also ==
- ACS Applied Materials & Interfaces
