= Wind Energy (journal) =

- Discipline: Energy and fuel
- Language: English
- Edited by: Simon Watson

Publication details
- History: 1998–present
- Publisher: Wiley
- Frequency: Monthly
- Impact factor: 2.730 (2020)

Standard abbreviations
- ISO 4: Wind Energy

Indexing
- ISSN: 1095-4244

Links
- Journal homepage

Wind Energy is a monthly peer-reviewed scientific journal covering research on wind power published by John Wiley & Sons. The editor-in-chief is Simon Watson (Delft University of Technology). According to the Journal Citation Reports, the journal has a 2020 impact factor of 2.730, ranking it 78th out of 114 journals in "Energy & Fuels" and 54th out of 135 journals in "Engineering Mechanical".

== See also ==
- List of renewable energy journals
