= Nuclear Physics and Atomic Energy (journal) =

- Discipline: Nuclear physics, particle physics, atomic energy, radiation physics, plasma physics, radiobiology, radioecology, technique, experimental methods
- Language: English, Ukrainian, Russian
- Edited by: V. I. Slisenko

Publication details
- History: 2000-present
- Publisher: Institute for Nuclear Research (NASU) (Ukraine)
- Frequency: Quarterly
- Open access: Yes
- License: CC BY-NC 4.0

Standard abbreviations
- ISO 4: Nucl. Phys. At. Energy

Indexing
- ISSN: 1818-331X (print); 2074-0565 (web)
- LCCN: 2007201502
- OCLC no.: 1000382675

Links
- Journal homepage

Nuclear Physics and Atomic Energy is a quarterly peer-reviewed open-access scientific journal published by Institute for Nuclear Research of the National Academy of Sciences of Ukraine. It was established in 2000 and covers all aspects of nuclear physics, particle physics, atomic energy, radiation physics, plasma physics, radiobiology, radioecology, technique and experimental methods. The editor-in-chief is V.I. Slisenko (Institute for Nuclear Research). Articles are published in English, Ukrainian or Russian with titles and abstracts in all three languages.

== Abstracting and indexing ==
The journal is abstracted and indexed in Scopus.
