= International Conference on Neutrino Physics and Astrophysics =

The International Conference on Neutrino Physics and Astrophysics is a significant international conference series, sponsored by the International Union of Pure and Applied Physics, in the field of neutrino physics, during which talks detailing notable progress in theoretical and experimental work are given. In addition, the conference reviews the status of proposed research in neutrino physics and astrophysics. Held every two years, the conference programs consist of plenary sessions with invited speakers, poster sessions and short evening talks. The shorthand designator for a particular conference is "Neutrino" followed by its year, e.g. Neutrino 2011.

The first conference was held in Balatonfüred in 1972; however, three preceding conferences are often referenced with respect to the history of the Neutrino series. These meetings include the 1965 Informal Conference on Experimental Neutrino Physics at CERN; a 1968 conference in Moscow sponsored by the Academy of the USSR, which was organized just after certain cosmic ray neutrino events were seen in the gold mines of India, South Africa and Utah; and a 1970 meeting in Cortona.

Each conference is organized by the Co-Chairs and is supervised by a changing International Advisory Committee as well as the permanent International Neutrino Commission. The latter is assembled from the chairs of former conferences. George Marx was the founding chair of INC until the end of 2002 conference, followed by Jacob Schneps until the end Neutrino 2014 and the current chair is Stephen Parke. The primary purpose of the INC is to choose the Co-Chairs for future conferences, which typically also determines the location of that conference.

This conference series encompasses many different branches of neutrino physics and neutrino astrophysics and is currently held bi-annually, rotating roughly between Europe, the Americas and Asia/Oceania. A list of the conferences with links to the proceedings either written or virtual is given below:

International Neutrino Conference Series
Number	Year	City, Country	Chair or Co-Chairs
#1	1972	Balaton, Hungary	George Marx
#2	1974	Philadelphia, USA	Sidney Bludman
#3	1975	Balaton, Hungary	George Marx
#4	1976	Aachen, Germany	Helmut Faissner
#5	1977	Elbrus, USSR	M. Markov, A.Tavkhelidze, G. Zatsepin
#6	1978	Lafayette, USA	Earle Fowler
#7	1979	Bergen, Norway	Cecilia Jarlskog
#8	1980	Erice, Italy	Ettore Fiorini
#9	1981	Maui, Hawaii, USA	Vincent Peterson
#10	1982	Balaton, Hungary	Deszo Kiss, George Marx
#11	1984	Nordkirchen, Germany	Konrad Kleinknecht
#12	1986	Sendai, Japan	Toshio Kitagaki
#13	1988	Boston, USA	Jacob Schneps
#14	1990	Geneva, Switzerland	Klaus Winter
#15	1992	Granada, Spain	Angel Morales
#16	1994	Eilat, Israel	Arnon Dar
#17	1996	Helsinki, Finland	Matts Roos
#18	1998	Takayama, Japan	Yoichiro Suzuki, Yoji Totsuka
#19	2000	Sudbury, Canada	Art McDonald
#20	2002	Munich, Germany	Franz v. Feilitzsch, Norbert Schmitz
#21	2004	Paris, France	François Vannucci, Daniel Vignaud
#22	2006	Santa Fe, USA	Thomas Bowles
#23	2008	Christchurch, New Zealand	J. Adams, F. Halzen, S. Parke
#24	2010	Athens, Greece	George Tzanakos
#25	2012	Kyoto, Japan	T. Kobayashi, M. Nakahata, T.Nakaya
#26	2014	Boston, USA	Gary Feldman, Ed Kearns
#27	2016	London, UK	Ken Long, Silvia Pascoli
#28	2018	Heidelberg, Germany	Guido Drexlin, Manfred Lindner
#29	2020	Chicago, USA	S. Brice, M. Marshak, G. Zeller
#30	2022	Seoul, South Korea	Yeongduk Kim, Seon-Hee Seo
#31	2024	Milan, Italy	Chiara Brofferio, Gioacchino Ranucci
#32	2026	Irvine, USA	Mu-Chun Chen, Michael Smy
#33	2028	China	
#34	2030	Europe	
#35	2032	...	
