= Nuclear Science and Techniques =

- Discipline: Nuclear physics, synchrotron radiation applications, ray technology, nuclear energy
- Language: English
- Edited by: Yu-Gang Ma

Publication details
- History: 1990–present
- Publisher: Science Press, Springer (China)
- Frequency: Monthly
- Impact factor: 1.556 (2019)

Standard abbreviations
- ISO 4: Nucl. Sci. Tech.

Indexing
- CODEN: NSETEC
- ISSN: 1001-8042
- LCCN: 2004262315
- OCLC no.: 316000276

Links
- Journal homepage; Online access; Online archive; Online access

Nuclear Science and Techniques is a monthly peer-reviewed, scientific journal that is published by Science Press and Springer. This journal was established in 1990. The editor-in-chief is Yu-Gang Ma. The journal covers all theoretical and experimental aspects of nuclear physics and technology, including synchrotron radiation applications, beam line technology, accelerator, ray technology and applications, nuclear chemistry, radiochemistry, and radiopharmaceuticals and nuclear medicine, nuclear electronics and instrumentation, nuclear energy science and engineering.

== Abstracing and indexing ==
The journal is indexed in the Science Citation Index Expanded. According to the Journal Citation Reports, the journal has a 2017 impact factor of 1.085, ranking it 18th out of 33 journals in the category "Nuclear Science and Technology" and 18th out of 20 journals in the category "Physics, Nuclear".
