= Radiation detection =

The following Radiological protection instruments can be used to detect and measure ionizing radiation:

- Ionization chambers
- Gaseous ionization detectors
- Geiger counters
- Photodetectors
- Scintillation counters
- Semiconductor detectors
