= Heat and Mass Transfer =

- Discipline: Engineering, Thermodynamics
- Language: English
- Edited by: Andrea Luke

Publication details
- Former name(s): Wärme- und Stoffübertragung
- History: 1995–present
- Publisher: Springer (Germany)
- Frequency: Monthly
- Impact factor: 1.867 (2019)

Standard abbreviations
- ISO 4: Heat Mass Transf.

Indexing
- ISSN: 0947-7411 (print); 1432-1181 (web)
- LCCN: 83640050
- OCLC no.: 43576360

Links
- Journal homepage

Heat and Mass Transfer is a peer-reviewed scientific journal published by Springer. It serves the circulation of new developments in the field of basic research of heat and mass transfer phenomena, as well as related material properties and their measurements. Thereby applications to engineering problems are promoted. The journal publishes original research reports.

As of 1995 the title Wärme- und Stoffübertragung was changed to Heat and Mass Transfer.

== Indexing ==
Among others, the journal is indexed in Google Scholar, INIS Atomindex, Journal Citation Reports/Science Edition, OCLC, PASCAL, Science Citation Index, Science Citation Index Expanded (SciSearch) and Scopus.
