= The Energy Journal =

- Discipline: Energy economics
- Language: English
- Edited by: Adonis Yatchew

Publication details
- History: 1980–present
- Publisher: International Association for Energy Economics
- Frequency: Quarterly
- Open access: Hybrid
- Impact factor: 1.772 (2014)

Standard abbreviations
- ISO 4: Energy J.

Indexing
- ISSN: 0195-6574 (print); 1944-9089 (web)
- LCCN: 82641077
- JSTOR: 01956574
- OCLC no.: 563150979

Links
- Journal homepage; Online access; Online archive

The Energy Journal is a quarterly peer-reviewed academic journal published by the International Association for Energy Economics and covering issues related to energy economics. It was established in 1980 and the editor-in-chief is Adonis Yatchew (University of Toronto).

== Impact and reception ==
According to the Journal Citation Reports, the journal has a 2014 impact factor of 1.772, ranking it 23rd out of 88 journals in the category "Energy & Fuels".

== Abstracting and indexing ==
The journal is abstracted and indexed in:

- Science Citation Index Expanded,
- ProQuest databases,
- Scopus,
- EBSCO databases.

== See also ==
- Energy Economics
- List of economics journals
- List of energy journals
- List of renewable energy journals
- Resource and Energy Economics
