= Charles Leonard Huskins =

English-born Canadian geneticist

- Born: 30 November 1897; Walsall, England
- Died: 26 July 1953 (aged 55)
- Education: University of Alberta; King's College London
- Scientific career
- Fields: cytogenetics
- Institutions: McGill University; University of Wisconsin–Madison

Charles Leonard Huskins (November 30, 1897 – July 26, 1953) was an English-born Canadian geneticist who specialized in the field of cytogenetics. He is also sometimes referred to as C. Leonard Huskins or C.L. Huskins.

Huskins was born in Walsall, England, and moved with his family at the age of 9 to Red Deer, Alberta, Canada. He served in the Canadian Infantry and as an aviator in the Royal Flying Corps (which became the RAF) in World War I.

After the war Huskins returned to Canada and enrolled in the University of Alberta from which he received his bachelor's degree in 1923 and his master's degree in 1925. With the aid of a scholarship for graduate study abroad, he went to England where he obtained his Ph.D. from King's College London in 1927. Huskins stayed on in England from 1927 to 1930 to do research with the renowned geneticist William Bateson at what is now the John Innes Centre.

In 1930 Huskins returned to Canada to teach at McGill University in Montreal. He taught initially (1930-1934) in the Department of Botany and then (1934-1945) as professor in the Department of Genetics, the first head of a department of genetics in Canada. In 1945 he left McGill for the University of Wisconsin–Madison where he was professor of botany until his death. In 1942-1943 Huskins spent a year at Columbia University on a Guggenheim Fellowship he was awarded "to prepare a book on the cytology and genetics of plants, animals and man." Except for that year, he spent essentially all of his career at McGill and Wisconsin.

Huskins worked at first on mutations in oats and wheat. At the Innes Centre he studied a species of the grass Spartina (cordgrass) and showed that a suspected hybrid had undergone chromosome doubling in the course of evolution, one of the first demonstrations of this phenomenon. He then went on to do research on chromosome synapsis and crossing-over in higher plants, grasshoppers and mice. Huskins and F. M. Hearne published the first studies on the cytology of the grasshopper in 1935 and in 1936 they published on animal cytology (on chiasma frequencies in mice).

The Genetics Society of Canada established the Huskins Memorial Lecture in his honor and there is a C. Leonard Huskins Professor of Botany at University of Wisconsin–Madison.
