= Matthaios Santamouris =

Greek-Australian building scientist and academic

Matthaios Santamouris AM is a Greek Australian physicist and building scientist. He is the Anita Lawrence Chair in High Performance Architecture and a Scientia Distinguished Professor at the University of New South Wales (UNSW) in Sydney, Australia.He previously served as a professor of physics at the National and Kapodistrian University of Athens in Greece. His research focuses on urban heat, the energy performance of buildings, cooling technologies and materials, and the effects of urban climate on the built environment and human health.

== Early life and education ==
He studied physics at the University of Patras, where he received a diploma in physics and a PhD in energy physics. He later pursued postgraduate studies in energy physics at the Institute National Polytechnique de Grenoble in France, earning a Diplôme d’études approfondies (DEA).

== Career ==
Santamouris spent much of his academic career at the National and Kapodistrian University of Athens, where he conducted research on energy use in buildings and the relationship between the built environment and the environment. He also served as president of the Centre for Renewable Energy Sources and Saving (CRES), Greece's national centre for renewable energy.

In 2016, he moved to UNSW Sydney, where he became a professor in the Faculty of Arts, Design and Architecture. He was appointed a Scientia Distinguished Professor in 2019 and holds the Anita Lawrence Chair in High Performance Architecture.He has also held visiting professorships at several universities internationally.

== Research ==
Santamouris's research focuses on urban climate and the energy performance of buildings, particularly the causes and effects of urban overheating and the urban heat island effect. His work has examined measures for reducing urban temperatures, including reflective materials, cool roofs and pavements, green roofs, and passive and hybrid cooling systems. He has also investigated the effects of urban heat on building energy use and on heat-related health, with particular attention to vulnerable populations.

Santamouris was a senior author of a 2024 study published in Nature Cities that modelled different heat-mitigation strategies for a precinct in Riyadh, Saudi Arabia. The study assessed 3,323 buildings and estimated that some of the measures could reduce peak summer temperatures by up to 4.5 °C. He also contributed to the 2017 Cooling Western Sydney study, commissioned by Sydney Water, which examined the use of water and reflective materials as measures for reducing urban heat.

== Editorial work ==
Santamouris is one of the two editors-in-chief of Energy and Buildings, published by Elsevier, alongside Jianlei Niu of the Hong Kong Polytechnic University. UNSW additionally lists him as an associate editor and editorial-board member of other peer-reviewed journals in the fields of energy, buildings and the environment.

== Awards and honours ==
Santamouris was appointed a Member of the Order of Australia (AM) in the King's Birthday Honours, "for significant service to architecture, energy and environmental quality", and has been named a Clarivate Highly Cited Researcher for several consecutive years. He was also named an Honorary Fellow of the Royal Institute of British Architects (RIBA). His another honours include the lifetime Achievement Award from the Passive and Low Energy Architecture (PLEA) organization for his contribution to sustainable architecture and urban overheating mitigation, as well as an honorary doctorate from the Faculty of Engineering at the University of Cyprus. He is a Fellow of the World Academy of Art and Science.
