= Journal of Renewable and Sustainable Energy =

- Discipline: Physics
- Language: English
- Edited by: Carlos F. M. Coimbra

Publication details
- History: 2009-present
- Publisher: American Institute of Physics (United States)
- Frequency: bimonthly
- Impact factor: 2.847 (2021)

Standard abbreviations
- ISO 4: J. Renew. Sustain. Energy

Indexing
- ISSN: 1941-7012

Links
- Journal homepage

The Journal of Renewable and Sustainable Energy is a free and rapid publishing peer-reviewed, online-only, open access, scientific journal published by the American Institute of Physics covering most areas of renewable and sustainable energy-related fields that apply to the physical science and engineering communities. Online submissions are posted daily and organized into bimonthly issues. The journal was established in 2009. Since 2019, the Editor-in-Chief is Carlos F. M. Coimbra (University of California San Diego) and the Deputy Editors are Jan Kleissl (University of California San Diego) and Raúl Cal (Portland State University). The journal was founded by Co-Editors-in-Chief P. Craig Taylor (Colorado School of Mines) and John A. Turner (National Renewable Energy Laboratory).

== Impact ==
The Journal's 2021 impact factor was 2.847.

== See also ==
- List of renewable energy journals
