= Energy for Sustainable Development =

Energy for Sustainable Development is a peer-reviewed academic journal covering research on energy-related aspects of sustainable development. It is published by Elsevier and the editor-in-chief is Subhes C. Bhattacharyya. According to the Journal Citation Reports, the journal has a 2024 impact factor of 4.9.

== See also ==
- List of renewable energy journals
