= Progress in Nuclear Energy =

- Discipline: Nuclear engineering
- Language: English
- Edited by: Yousry Azmy, Simon Middleburgh, Guanghui Su

Publication details
- History: 1977–present
- Publisher: Elsevier
- Frequency: Monthly
- Open access: Hybrid
- Impact factor: 2.461 (2021)

Standard abbreviations
- ISO 4: Prog. Nucl. Energy

Indexing
- CODEN: PNENDE
- ISSN: 0149-1970
- LCCN: 80649668
- OCLC no.: 223638502

Links
- Journal homepage; Online archive

Progress in Nuclear Energy is a monthly peer-reviewed scientific journal covering research on nuclear energy and nuclear science. It was established in 1977 and is published by Elsevier.

The current editors-in-chief are Yousry Azmy (North Carolina State University), Simon Middleburgh (Bangor University), and Guanghui Su (Xi'an Jiaotong University).

== Abstracting and indexing ==
The journal is abstracted and indexed in:

- Chemical Abstracts Service
- Science Citation Index Expanded
- Current Contents/Engineering, Computing & Technology
- Scopus

According to the Journal Citation Reports, the journal has a 2021 impact factor of 2.461.
