= Energy Storage Materials =

- Discipline: Energy
- Language: English

Publication details
- History: 2015–present
- Publisher: Elsevier
- Frequency: 10/year
- Open access: Hybrid
- Impact factor: 18.9 (2023)

Standard abbreviations
- ISO 4: Energy Storage Mater.

Indexing
- ISSN: 2405-8289
- OCLC no.: 944014043

Links
- Journal homepage; Online archive

Energy Storage Materials is a peer-reviewed scientific journal published by Elsevier covering research and advances in the fields of advanced energy storage and conversion, particularly with regard to materials and their role in the processes. It was established in 2015.

== Abstracting and indexing ==
The journal is abstracted and indexed in:

- Inspec
- Science Citation Index Expanded
- Scopus

According to the Journal Citation Reports, the journal has a 2023 impact factor of 18.9.
