= Solar Energy Materials and Solar Cells =

- Discipline: Solar cells
- Language: English
- Edited by: Ivan Gordon

Publication details
- History: 1968-present
- Publisher: Elsevier (The Netherlands)
- Frequency: Monthly
- Impact factor: 7.267 (2020)

Standard abbreviations
- ISO 4: Sol. Energy Mater. Sol. Cells

Indexing
- ISSN: 0927-0248

Links
- Journal homepage; Online access

Solar Energy Materials and Solar Cells is a scientific journal published by Elsevier covering research related to solar energy materials and solar cells. According to the Journal Citation Reports, Solar Energy Materials and Solar Cells has a 2020 impact factor of 7.267.

== Controversies ==
A paper titled "Ageing effects of perovskite solar cells under different environmental factors and electrical load conditions" published in 2018 in the journal corresponded to a paper previously published in the journal Nature Energy as "Systematic investigation of the impact of operation conditions on the degradation behaviour of perovskite solar cells". It led to an investigation of plagiarism.

== See also ==
- List of periodicals published by Elsevier
