= Radiation Measurements =

- Discipline: Radiation physics
- Language: English
- Edited by: Eduardo Yukihara, Adrie J.J. Bos

Publication details
- Former name(s): Nuclear Tracks and Radiation Measurements; Nuclear Tracks; Nuclear Track Detection
- History: 1994–present
- Publisher: Elsevier
- Frequency: Monthly
- Open access: Hybrid
- Impact factor: 1.898 (2020)

Standard abbreviations
- ISO 4: Radiat. Meas.

Indexing
- CODEN: RMEAEP
- ISSN: 1350-4487
- OCLC no.: 31277902

Links
- Journal homepage; Online access

Radiation Measurements is a monthly peer-reviewed scientific journal covering research on nuclear science and radiation physics. It was established in 1994 and is published by Elsevier.

The current editors-in-chief are Eduardo Yukihara (Paul Scherrer Institute Radiation Protection and Security) and Adrie J.J. Bos (Delft University of Technology).

== Abstracting and indexing ==
The journal is abstracted and indexed in:

- Chemical Abstracts Service
- Index Medicus/MEDLINE/PubMed
- Science Citation Index Expanded
- Current Contents/Physical, Chemical & Earth Sciences
- Scopus

According to the Journal Citation Reports, the journal has a 2020 impact factor of 1.898.

== Former titles history ==
Radiation Measurements is derived from the following former titles:

- Nuclear Track Detection (1977-1978) (Note: CASSI ISSN Search: 0145-224X.)
- Nuclear Tracks (1979-1981) (Note: CASSI ISSN Search: 0191-278X.)
- Nuclear Tracks and Radiation Measurements (1982-1985) (Note: CASSI ISSN Search: 0969-8078.)
- International Journal of Radiation Applications and Instrumentation. Part D. Nuclear Tracks and Radiation Measurements (1986-1992)
- Nuclear Tracks and Radiation Measurements (1993)
- Radiation Measurements (1994–present)
