= ACS Applied Materials & Interfaces =

- Discipline: Chemistry, biochemistry, physics
- Language: English
- Edited by: Xing Yi Ling

Publication details
- History: 2009–present
- Publisher: American Chemical Society (United States)
- Frequency: Weekly
- Impact factor: 8.5 (2023)

Standard abbreviations
- ISO 4: ACS Appl. Mater. Interfaces

Indexing
- CODEN: AAMICK
- ISSN: 1944-8244 (print); 1944-8252 (web)
- LCCN: 2008201974
- OCLC no.: 238703087

Links
- Journal homepage; Online access; Online archive

ACS Applied Materials & Interfaces is a peer-reviewed scientific journal that was established in 2009 by the American Chemical Society. Originally published monthly, the journal became biweekly in 2013 and weekly in 2015. The current editor-in-chief is Xing Yi Ling (Nanyang Technological University). The journal covers research on advanced active and passive electronic/optical materials, coatings, colloids, biomaterials and bio-interfaces, polymers, hybrid and composite materials; and friction and wear.

== Abstracting and indexing ==
The journal is abstracted and indexed in: CAS, MEDLINE/PubMed, Current Contents, and Science Citation Index Expanded. According to the Journal Citation Reports, the journal has a 2023 impact factor of 8.5.

== See also ==
- ACS Applied Energy Materials
