= International Journal of Radiation Biology =

- Discipline: Radiobiology
- Language: English
- Edited by: Professor Gayle Woloschak

Publication details
- Former name(s): International Journal of Radiation Biology and Related Studies in Physics, Chemistry and Medicine
- History: 1988–present
- Publisher: Informa
- Frequency: Monthly
- Open access: Hybrid
- Impact factor: 2.368 (2019)

Standard abbreviations
- ISO 4: Int. J. Radiat. Biol.

Indexing
- CODEN: IJRBE7
- ISSN: 0955-3002 (print); 1362-3095 (web)

Links
- Journal homepage

The International Journal of Radiation Biology is a monthly peer-reviewed medical journal that covers research into the effects of ionizing and non-ionizing radiation in biology. The editor-in-chief is Professor Gayle Woloschak.

The title was formerly known as International Journal of Radiation Biology and Related Studies in Physics, Chemistry and Medicine, having changed its name in 1988.

== Abstracting and indexing ==
The journal is abstracted and indexed in:

- Chemical Abstracts Service
- Index Medicus/MEDLINE/PubMed
- Science Citation Index Expanded
- Current Contents/Life Sciences
- BIOSIS Previews
- Scopus

According to the Journal Citation Reports, the journal has a 2014 impact factor of 1.687.
