= Energy and Buildings =

- Discipline: Energy/Building Technology
- Language: English
- Edited by: Jianlei Niu, Mat Santamouris

Publication details
- History: 1977–present
- Publisher: Elsevier
- Frequency: Semi-monthly
- Open access: Hybrid
- Impact factor: 7.1 (2024)

Standard abbreviations
- ISO 4: Energy Build.

Indexing
- ISSN: 0378-7788 (print); 1872-6178 (web)
- LCCN: 79649964
- OCLC no.: 38888212

Links
- Journal homepage; Online archive

Energy and Buildings is a semi-monthly peer-reviewed scientific journal that covers all aspects of energy use in buildings and their impact on the environment. The journal is published by Elsevier and was established in 1977. The editors-in-chief are Jianlei Niu (Hong Kong Polytechnic University) and Mat Santamouris (University of New South Wales).

The journal publishes original research articles, review articles, and short communications.

== Abstracting and indexing ==
The journal is abstracted and indexed in:

- Current Contents/Engineering, Computing & Technology
- EBSCO databases
- Ei Compendex
- Inspec
- PASCAL
- ProQuest databases
- Science Citation Index Expanded
- Scopus

According to the Journal Citation Reports, the journal has a 2024 impact factor of 731.
