= Energy Economics (journal) =

- Discipline: Energy economics
- Language: English
- Edited by: Boqiang Lin

Publication details
- History: 1979-present
- Publisher: Elsevier
- Frequency: Bimonthly
- Impact factor: 13.5 (2025)

Standard abbreviations
- ISO 4: Energy Econ.

Indexing
- CODEN: EECODR
- ISSN: 0140-9883
- LCCN: 79646092
- OCLC no.: 38907734
- Journal of Energy Finance & Development
- ISSN: 1085-7443

Links
- Journal homepage; Online archive; Online archives of Journal of Energy Finance & Development

Energy Economics is a bimonthly peer-reviewed academic journal published by Elsevier covering the economic and econometric modelling and analysis of energy systems and issues (energy economics). It is considered one of the top journals for energy and environmental economics, ranking 7^{th} out of 755 in economics and econometrics, and 5^{th} out of 79 in energy in 2025. The editor-in-chief is Boqiang Lin (Xiamen University). The Journal of Energy Finance & Development (1996–1999) was incorporated into Energy Economics in 1999.

== Abstracting and indexing ==
The journal is abstracted and indexed in:

- Current Contents
- GEOBASE
- Journal of Economic Literature
- Research Papers in Economics
- Social Sciences Citation Index

According to the Journal Citation Reports, the journal has a 2025 impact factor of 13.5.

== See also ==
- The Energy Journal
- Resource and Energy Economics
