= Energies (journal) =

Scientific journal

- Discipline: Physics, chemistry, engineering, computer sciences, economics
- Language: English
- Edited by: Enrico Sciubba

Publication details
- History: 2008-present
- Publisher: MDPI
- Frequency: Biweekly
- Open access: Yes
- Impact factor: 3.252 (2021)

Standard abbreviations
- ISO 4: Energies

Indexing
- CODEN: ENERGA
- ISSN: 1996-1073
- OCLC no.: 650101077

Links
- Journal homepage

Energies is a biweekly peer-reviewed open-access scientific journal. It was established in 2008 and is published by MDPI. The editor-in-chief is Enrico Sciubba (Sapienza University of Rome). The journal publishes original papers, review articles, technical notes, and letters to the editor. It concentrates on scientific research, technology, engineering, and management in relation to the field of energy supply, conversion, dispatch, and final usage.

The journal occasionally publishes special issues on specific topics.

== Abstracting and indexing ==
The journal is abstracted and indexed in:

- CAB Abstracts
- Chemical Abstracts Service
- Compendex
- Current Contents/Engineering, Computing & Technology
- EBSCO databases
- Inspec
- Science Citation Index Expanded
- Scopus

According to the Journal Citation Reports, the journal has a 2020 impact factor of 3.004.
