= Energy economics =

Discipline that includes topics related to supply and use of energy in societies

Energy economics is a broad scientific subject area which includes topics related to supply and use of energy in societies. Considering the cost of energy services and associated value gives economic meaning to the efficiency at which energy can be produced. Energy services can be defined as functions that generate and provide energy to the “desired end services or states”. The efficiency of energy services is dependent on the engineered technology used to produce and supply energy. The goal is to minimise energy input required (e.g. kWh, mJ, see Units of Energy) to produce the energy service, such as lighting (lumens), heating (temperature) and fuel (natural gas). The main sectors considered in energy economics are transportation and building, although it is relevant to a broad scale of human activities, including households and businesses at a microeconomic level and resource management and environmental impacts at a macroeconomic level.

Interdisciplinary scientist Vaclav Smil has asserted that "every economic activity is fundamentally nothing but a conversion of one kind of energy to another, and monies are just a convenient (and often rather unrepresentative) proxy for valuing the energy flows."

== History ==
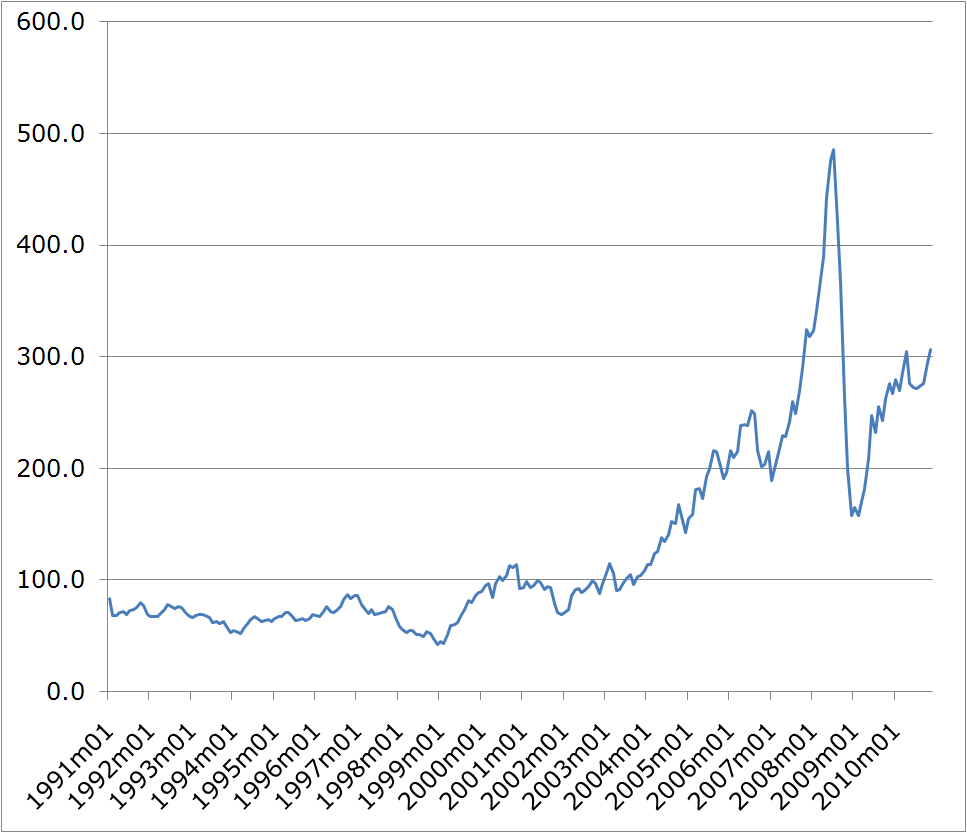
World prices for energy, 1991–2010. 2000=100.

Energy related issues have been actively present in economic literature since the 1973 oil crisis, but have their roots much further back in the history. As early as 1865, W.S. Jevons expressed his concern about the eventual depletion of coal resources in his book The Coal Question. One of the best known early attempts to work on the economics of exhaustible resources (incl. fossil fuel) was made by H. Hotelling, who derived a price path for non-renewable resources, known as Hotelling's rule.

Development of energy economics theory over the last two centuries can be attributed to three main economic subjects – the rebound effect, the energy efficiency gap and more recently, 'green nudges'.

=== Rebound effect studies (1860s to 1930s) ===
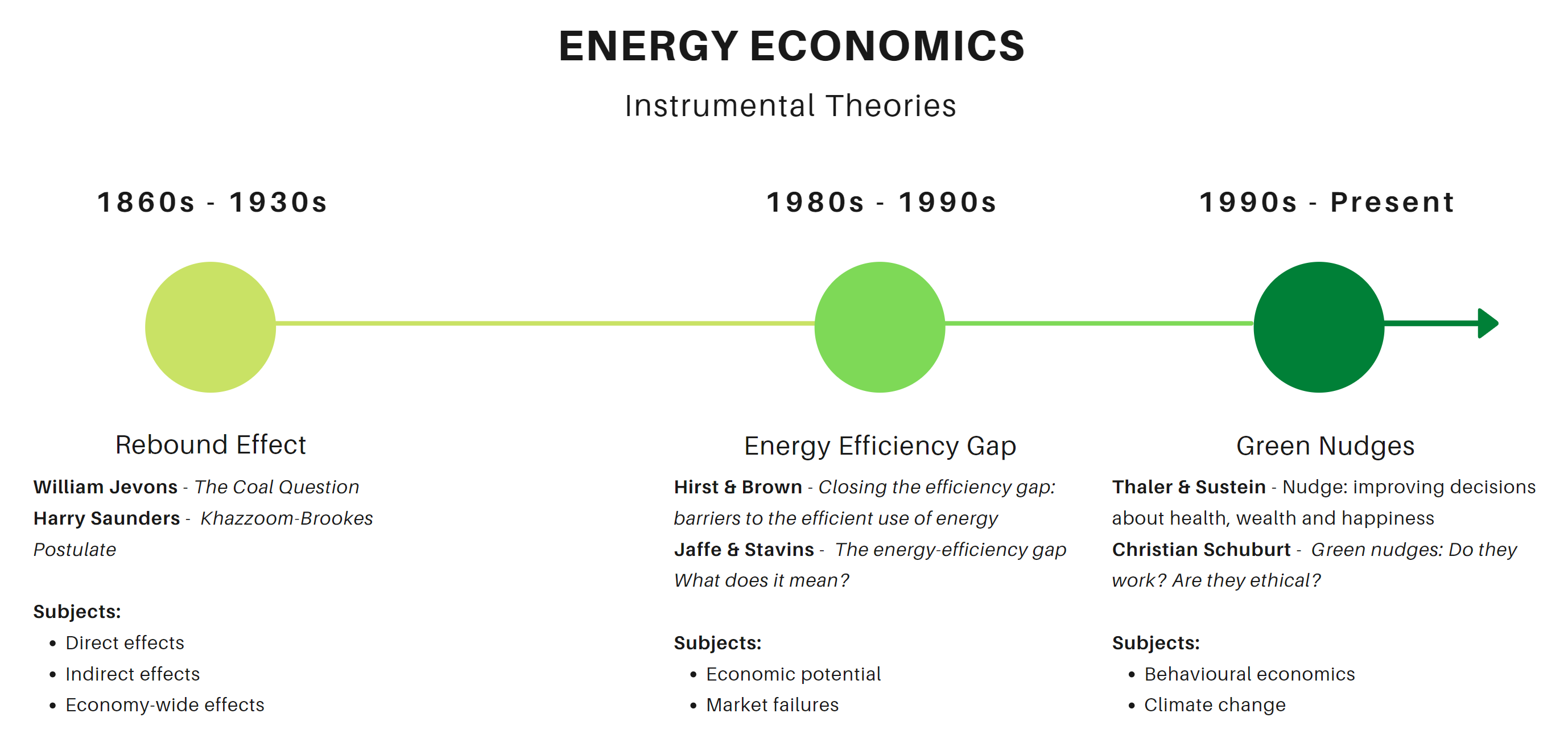
Timeline of instrumental theories of energy economics

While energy efficiency is improved with new technology, expected energy savings are less-than proportional to the efficiency gains due to behavioural responses. There are three behavioural sub-theories to be considered: the direct rebound effect, which anticipates increased use of the energy service that was improved; the indirect rebound effect, which considers an increased income effect created by savings then allowing for increased energy consumption, and; the economy-wide effect, which results from an increase in energy prices due to the newly developed technology improvements.

=== Energy efficiency gap studies (1980s to 1990s) ===
Suboptimal investment in improvement of energy efficiency resulting from market failures/barriers prevents the optimal use of energy. From an economical standpoint, a rational decision-maker with perfect information will optimally choose between the trade-off of initial investment and energy costs. However, due to uncertainties such as environmental externalities, the optimal potential energy efficiency is not always able to be achieved, thus creating an energy efficiency gap.

=== Green nudges (1990s to Current) ===
While the energy efficiency gap considers economical investments, it does not consider behavioural anomalies in energy consumers. Growing concerns surrounding climate change and other environmental impacts have led to what economists would describe as irrational behaviours being exhibited by energy consumers. A contribution to this has been government interventions, coined "green nudges’ by Thaler and Sustein (2008), such as feedback on energy bills. Now that it is realised people do not behave rationally, research into energy economics is more focused on behaviours and impacting decision-making to close the energy efficiency gap.

== Economic factors ==
Due to diversity of issues and methods applied and shared with a number of academic disciplines, energy economics does not present itself as a self-contained academic discipline, but it is an applied subdiscipline of economics. From the list of main topics of economics, some relate strongly to energy economics:

- Computable general equilibrium
- Econometrics
- Environmental economics
- Finance
- Industrial organization
- Input–output model
- Microeconomics
- Macroeconomics
- Operations research
- Resource economics

Energy economics also draws heavily on results of energy engineering, geology, political sciences, ecology etc. Recent focus of energy economics includes the following issues:

- Climate change and climate policy
- Demand response
- Elasticity of supply and demand in energy market
- Energy and economic growth
- Energy derivatives
- Energy elasticity
- Energy forecasting
- Energy markets and electricity markets - liberalisation, (de- or re-) regulation
- energy infrastructure
- Environmental policy
- Sustainability

Some institutions of higher education (universities) recognise energy economics as a viable career opportunity, offering this as a curriculum. The University of Cambridge, Massachusetts Institute of Technology and the Vrije Universiteit Amsterdam are the top three research universities, and Resources for the Future the top research institute. There are numerous other research departments, companies, and professionals offering energy economics studies and consultations.

== International Association for Energy Economics ==
International Association for Energy Economics (IAEE) is an international non-profit society of professionals interested in energy economics. IAEE was founded in 1977, during the period of the energy crisis. IAEE is incorporated under United States laws and has headquarters in Cleveland.

The IAEE operates through a 17-member Council of elected and appointed members. Council and officer members serve in a voluntary position.

IAEE has over 4,500 members worldwide (in over 100 countries). There are more than 25 national chapters, in countries where membership exceeds 25 individual members. Some of the regularly active national chapters of the IAEE are; USAEE - United States; GEE - Germany; BIEE - Great Britain; AEE - France; AIEE - Italy.

=== Publications ===
The International Association for Energy Economics publishes three publications throughout the year:

- The Energy Journal, a quarterly academic publication
- the Economics of Energy & Environmental Policy, a semi-annual publication
- the Energy Forum

=== Conferences ===
The IAEE conferences address critical issues of vital concern and importance to governments and industries and provide a forum where policy issues are presented, considered and discussed at both formal sessions and informal social functions.

IAEE typically holds five Conferences each year. The main annual conference for IAEE is the IAEE International Conference which is organized at diverse locations around the world. From the year 1996 on these conferences have taken place (or will take place) in the following cities:

- 2021 - Online Conference
- 2020 - No Conference
- 2019 - Montreal, Canada
- 2018 - Groningen, The Netherlands.
- 2017 - Singapore.
- 2016 - Bergen, Norway.
- 2015 - Antalya, Turkey.
- 2014 - New York City, United States.
- 2013 - Daegu, South Korea.
- 2012 - Perth, Australia (35th).
- 2011 - Stockholm, Sweden.
- 2010 - Rio, Brazil.
- 2009 - San Francisco, United States.
- 2008 - Istanbul, Turkey.
- 2007 - Wellington, New Zealand.
- 2006 - Potsdam, Germany.
- 2005 - Taipei, China (Taipei).
- 2003 - Prague, Czech Republic.
- 2002 - Aberdeen, Scotland.
- 2001 - Houston, Texas.
- 2000 - Sydney, Australia.
- 1999 - Rome, Italy.
- 1998 - Quebec, Canada.
- 1997 - New Delhi, India.
- 1996 - Budapest, Hungary.

Other annual IAEE conferences are the North American Conference and the European Conference.

=== IAEE Awards ===
The Association's Immediate Past President annually chairs the Awards committee that selects the award recipients.

- Outstanding Contributions to the Profession
- Outstanding Contributions to the IAEE
- The Energy Journal Campbell Watkins Best Paper Award
- Economics of Energy & Environmental Policy Best Paper Award
- Journalism Award

== Sources, links and portals ==
Leading journals of energy economics include:

- Energy Economics
- The Energy Journal
- Resource and Energy Economics

There are several other journals that regularly publish papers in energy economics:

- Energy – The International Journal
- Energy Policy
- International Journal of Global Energy Issues
- Journal of Energy Markets
- Utilities Policy

Much progress in energy economics has been made through the conferences of the International Association for Energy Economics, the model comparison exercises of the (Stanford) Energy Modeling Forum and the meetings of the International Energy Workshop.

IDEAS/RePEc has a collection of recent working papers.

== Leading energy economists ==
The top 20 leading energy economists as of December 2016 are:

- Martin L. Weitzman
- Lutz Kilian
- Robert S. Pindyck
- David M. Newbery
- Kenneth J. Arrow
- Richard S.J. Tol
- Severin Borenstein
- Geoffrey Aori Mabea
- Richard G. Newell
- Frederick (Rick) van der Ploeg
- Michael Greenstone
- Richard Schmalensee
- James Hamilton
- Robert Norman Stavins
- Ilhan Ozturk
- Paul Joskow
- Ramazan Sari
- Jeffrey A. Frankel
- David Ian Stern
- Kenneth S. Rogoff
- Rafal Weron
- Michael Gerald Pollitt
- Ugur Soytas

== See also ==
- Energy economists (category)
- Cost of electricity by source
- Ecological economics
- Embodied energy
- Energy accounting
- Energy & Environment
- Energy balance
- Energy policy
- Energy subsidy
- Energy return on investment (EROEI)
- Industrial ecology
- International Energy Agency
- List of energy storage power plants
- Outline of energy
- Social metabolism
- Sustainable energy
- Technocracy movement
- Thermoeconomics
