= Annals of Nuclear Energy =

- Discipline: Nuclear engineering
- Language: English
- Edited by: Lynn E. Weaver, S. Mostafa Ghiaasiaan, Imre Pázsit

Publication details
- Former names: Annals of Nuclear Science and Engineering
- History: 1975–present
- Publisher: Elsevier
- Frequency: Monthly
- Open access: Hybrid
- Impact factor: 2.3 (2024)

Standard abbreviations
- ISO 4: Ann. Nucl. Energy

Indexing
- CODEN: ANENDJ
- ISSN: 0306-4549 (print); 1873-2100 (web)
- OCLC no.: 50375208

Links
- Journal homepage; Online access

Annals of Nuclear Energy is a monthly peer-reviewed scientific journal covering research on nuclear energy and nuclear science. It was established in 1975 and is published by Elsevier.

The current editors-in-chief are Lynn E. Weaver (Florida Institute of Technology), S. Mostafa Ghiaasiaan (Georgia Institute of Technology) and Imre Pázsit (Chalmers University of Technology).

== Abstracting and indexing ==
The journal is abstracted and indexed in:

- Chemical Abstracts Service
- Index Medicus/MEDLINE/PubMed
- Science Citation Index Expanded
- Current Contents/Engineering, Computing & Technology
- Scopus

According to the Journal Citation Reports, the journal has a 2013 impact factor of 1.020.

== Former titles history ==
Annals of Nuclear Energy is derived from the following former titles:

- Journal of Nuclear Energy (1954-1959) (Note: CASSI ISSN Search: 0022-3107.)
- Journal of Nuclear Energy. Part A. Reactor Science (1959-1961) (Note: CASSI ISSN Search: 0368-3265.)
- Journal of Nuclear Energy. Part B. Reactor Technology (1959) (Note: CASSI ISSN Search: 0368-3273.)
- Journal of Nuclear Energy. Parts A/B. Reactor Science and Technology (1961-1966) (Note: CASSI ISSN Search: 0368-3230.)
- Journal of Nuclear Energy (1967-1973)
- Annals of Nuclear Science and Engineering (1974) (Note: CASSI ISSN Search: 0302-2927.)
- Annals of Nuclear Energy (1975–present)
