= Wind Engineering (journal) =

- Discipline: Wind energy
- Language: English
- Edited by: Jon McGowan

Publication details
- History: 1977–present
- Publisher: Sage Publishing
- Frequency: Bimonthly
- Impact factor: 1.5 (2022)

Standard abbreviations
- ISO 4: Wind Eng.

Indexing
- ISSN: 0309-524X (print); 2048-402X (web)
- LCCN: 78640140
- JSTOR: 0309524X
- OCLC no.: 59012196

Links
- Journal homepage; Online access; Online archive

Wind Engineering is a bimonthly peer-reviewed scientific journal covering research on wind power published by Sage Publishing. The editor-in-chief is Jon McGowan (University of Massachusetts, Amherst). According to the Journal Citation Reports, the journal has a 2022 impact factor of 1.5.

The journal began in 1977 as a quarterly journal under the editorship of E. Mowforth at the University of Surrey, and was published by the Multi-Science Publishing Company. Starting with the first issue of 1983, it became the official journal of the European Wind Energy Association, with a new editorial board representing the EWEA; and starting with the second issue, it was additionally identified as the official journal of the British Wind Energy Association.
