= Energy Technology (journal) =

- Discipline: Energy technology
- Language: English
- Edited by: Sai Kishore Ravi

Publication details
- History: 2013-present
- Publisher: Wiley-VCH
- Frequency: Monthly
- Open access: Hybrid
- Impact factor: 3.8 (2022)

Standard abbreviations
- ISO 4: Energy Technol.

Indexing
- CODEN: ETNEFN
- ISSN: 2194-4288 (print); 2194-4296 (web)

Links
- Journal homepage; Online access; Online archive

Energy Technology is a monthly peer-reviewed scientific journal covering applied energy research. It was established in 2013 and is published by Wiley-VCH.

== Abstracting and indexing ==
The journal is abstracted and indexed in:

- Scopus
- Advanced Polymers Abstracts
- Chemical Abstracts Service
- ProQuest databases
- Current Contents/Engineering, Computing & Technology
- Inspec
- METADEX
- Science Citation Index Expanded
- VINITI Database RAS

According to the Journal Citation Reports, the journal has a 2022 impact factor of 3.8, ranking it 75th out of 121 journals in the category "Energy & Fuels".
