= Batteries (journal) =

- Discipline: Energy Storage, Electrochemistry
- Language: English

Publication details
- History: 2015–present
- Publisher: MDPI
- Frequency: Continuous
- Open access: Yes
- License: Creative Commons Attribution License
- Impact factor: 4.6 (2023)

Standard abbreviations
- ISO 4: Batteries

Indexing
- ISSN: 2313-0105

Links
- Journal homepage

Batteries is a peer-reviewed open-access scientific journal covering various aspects of energy storage and electrochemistry research. It is published by MDPI and was established in 2015.

The journal publishes research articles, reviews, and commentaries related to energy storage, electrochemical systems, and battery technology.

== Abstracting and indexing ==
The journal is abstracted and indexed in:

- DOAJ
- ProQuest databases
- CAB Abstracts
- Science Citation Index Expanded
- Scopus

According to the Journal Citation Reports, the journal has a 2022 impact factor of 4.6.
