= ACS Energy Letters =

- Discipline: Energy, chemistry
- Language: English
- Edited by: Prashant V. Kamat

Publication details
- History: 2016–present
- Publisher: American Chemical Society (United States)
- Frequency: Monthly
- Impact factor: 22.0 (2022)

Standard abbreviations
- ISO 4: ACS Energy Lett.

Indexing
- CODEN: AELCCP
- ISSN: 2380-8195
- LCCN: 2015203514
- OCLC no.: 920694114

Links
- Journal homepage; Online access; Online archive

ACS Energy Letters is a monthly peer-reviewed scientific journal published by the American Chemical Society. It was established in 2016 and the editor-in-chief is Prashant V. Kamat (University of Notre Dame). It covers research on all aspects of energy and aims for rapid publication.

== Abstracting and indexing ==
The journal is abstracted and indexed in:

- Ei Compendex
- Current Contents/Engineering, Computing & Technology
- Current Contents/Physical, Chemical & Earth Sciences
- Inspec
- Science Citation Index Expanded
- Scopus

According to the Journal Citation Reports, the journal has a 2022 impact factor of 22.

== Article types ==
The journal publishes the following article types: letters, energy express, reviews, perspectives, viewpoints, energy focus, and editorials.
