= Nano Energy =

- Discipline: Nanotechnology, energy
- Language: English
- Edited by: Zhiqun Lin & Weiguo Hu

Publication details
- History: 2012–present
- Publisher: Elsevier
- Frequency: Monthly
- Open access: Hybrid
- Impact factor: 16.8 (2023)

Standard abbreviations
- ISO 4: Nano Energy

Indexing
- CODEN: NEANCA
- ISSN: 2211-2855 (print); 2211-3282 (web)
- LCCN: 2012205204
- OCLC no.: 865269078

Links
- Journal homepage; Online access

Nano Energy is a monthly peer-reviewed scientific journal covering nanotechnology and energy. It was established in 2012 and is published by Elsevier. Current editor-in-chiefs are Zhiqun Lin (National University of Singapore) & Weiguo Hu (University of the Chinese Academy of Sciences).

== Abstracting and indexing ==
The journal is abstracted and indexed in:

- Chemical Abstracts Service
- Current Contents/Engineering, Computing & Technology
- Current Contents/Physical, Chemical & Earth Sciences
- Ei Compendex
- Inspec
- PASCAL
- Science Citation Index Expanded
- Scopus

According to the Journal Citation Reports, the journal has a 2023 impact factor of 16.8.
