= Energy Reports =

- Discipline: Energy research
- Language: English
- Edited by: Annamaria Buonomano

Publication details
- History: 2015-present
- Publisher: Elsevier
- Frequency: Continuous
- Open access: Yes
- License: CC BY-NC-ND 3.0
- Impact factor: 4.937 (2021)

Standard abbreviations
- ISO 4: Energy Rep.

Indexing
- ISSN: 2352-4847
- OCLC no.: 911198218

Links
- Journal homepage; Online access; Online archive

Energy Reports is a peer-reviewed open-access scientific journal covering all aspects of energy research. The journal was established in 2015 and is published by Elsevier. The editor-in-chief is Annamaria Buonomano (Università degli Studi di Napoli Federico II). Authors pay article processing charges, but do not retain unrestricted copyrights and publishing rights.

== Abstracting and indexing ==
The journal is abstracted and indexed in Ei Compendex, Scopus, and the Science Citation Index Expanded. According to the Journal Citation Reports, the journal has a 2021 impact factor of 4.937.

== Fictitious author identities and affiliations ==
In 2024, Energy Reports retracted two articles by Nicholas Zafetti for authorship manipulation and the fact that Zafetti's claimed affiliation, Clemson University, stated that "The records of the university do not support a relationship between Clemson University and Nicholas Zafetti as a student, faculty, or visiting scholar." In fact, Zafetti's identity is likely fictitious.

At nearly the same time, an article by Dragan Rodriguez, allegedly of Case Western Reserve University, was retracted for similar reasons. Two other articles by Rodriguez remain without amendment as of February 2025.

Another article was retracted partly because one of the authors stated an affiliation to a fictitious company.
