= Nature Energy =

- Discipline: Energy
- Language: English
- Edited by: Nicky Dean

Publication details
- History: 2016–present
- Publisher: Nature Portfolio (UK)
- Frequency: Monthly
- Open access: Hybrid
- Impact factor: 67.439 (2021)

Standard abbreviations
- ISO 4: Nat. Energy

Indexing
- CODEN: NEANFD
- ISSN: 2058-7546
- LCCN: 2020204268
- OCLC no.: 935996567

Links
- Journal homepage; Online archive

Nature Energy is a monthly peer-reviewed scientific journal published by Nature Portfolio. The editor-in-chief is Nicky Dean. The 2017 efficiency record (26.6%) in solar cell technology was published in the journal.

According to the Journal Citation Reports, the journal has a 2021 impact factor of 67.439, ranking it 1st out of 119 journals in the category "Energy & Fuels" and 2nd out of 345 journals in the category "Materials Science, Multidisciplinary".
