= Solar Energy (journal) =

- Discipline: Solar energy
- Language: English
- Edited by: Ranga Pitchumani

Publication details
- Former name: Solar Energy
- History: 1957–present
- Publisher: Elsevier on behalf of the International Solar Energy Society
- Impact factor: 7.9 (2025)

Standard abbreviations
- ISO 4: Sol. Energy

Indexing
- ISSN: 0038-092X
- Solar Energy
- ISSN: 0375-9865

Links
- Journal homepage; Online archive

Solar Energy is a peer-reviewed scientific journal and the official journal of the International Solar Energy Society. It covers research on all aspects of solar energy such as photovoltaics and solar heating, but also its indirect usages like wind power or bioenergy. According to the Journal Citation Reports, the journal has a 2025 impact factor of 7.9.
