= International Journal of Energy Research =

- Discipline: Energy
- Language: English
- Edited by: Maria Ronda Lloret

Publication details
- History: 1977–present
- Publisher: John Wiley & Sons
- Frequency: Monthly
- Open access: Yes
- Impact factor: 4.2 (2025)

Standard abbreviations
- ISO 4: Int. J. Energy Res.

Indexing
- CODEN: IJERDN
- ISSN: 0363-907X (print); 1099-114X (web)
- LCCN: 92640055
- OCLC no.: 42621034

Links
- Journal homepage; Online access; Online archive

The International Journal of Energy Research is a peer-reviewed open-access scientific journal published by John Wiley & Sons. It covers fossil, nuclear, and renewable energy sources, and research into energy storage. It was established in 1977 and the editor-in-chief is Maria Ronda Lloret.

== Abstracting and indexing ==
The journal is abstracted and indexed in:

- Chemical Abstracts Service
- Academic Search
- Aquatic Sciences & Fisheries Abstracts
- COMPENDEX
- Current Contents/Engineering, Computing & Technology
- ProQuest databases
- GeoRef
- Inspec
- METADEX
- PASCAL
- Science Citation Index Expanded
- Scopus
- VINITI Database RAS

According to the Journal Citation Reports, the journal has a 2025 impact factor of 4.2.
