= Energy Policy (journal) =

- Discipline: Energy policy
- Language: English

Publication details
- History: 1973-present
- Publisher: Elsevier
- Frequency: Monthly
- Open access: Hybrid
- Impact factor: 9.3 (2023)

Standard abbreviations
- ISO 4: Energy Policy

Indexing
- CODEN: ENPYAC
- ISSN: 0301-4215 (print); 1873-6777 (web)
- LCCN: 74641641
- OCLC no.: 645115783

Links
- Journal homepage; Online archive

Energy Policy is a monthly peer-reviewed academic journal covering research on energy policy and energy supply. It is published by Elsevier. According to the Journal Citation Reports, the journal has a 2023 impact factor of 9.3.
