= Resource and Energy Economics =

- Discipline: Energy economics, environmental economics
- Language: English
- Edited by: R. D. Horan, D. van Soest

Publication details
- Former names: Resources and Energy
- History: 1993-present
- Publisher: Elsevier
- Frequency: Quarterly
- Open access: Hybrid
- Impact factor: 1.920 (2017)

Standard abbreviations
- ISO 4: Resour. Energy Econ.

Indexing
- CODEN: REEEEF
- ISSN: 0928-7655 (print); 1873-0221 (web)
- LCCN: sn93029257
- OCLC no.: 858840788
- Resources and Energy
- ISSN: 0165-0572

Links
- Journal homepage; Online access; Resources and Energy online archive

Resource and Energy Economics is a quarterly peer-reviewed academic journal covering energy economics and environmental economics published by Elsevier. It was established in 1978 as Resources and Energy and obtained its current title in 1993. The editors-in-chief are R.D. Horan (Michigan State University) and D. van Soest (Tilburg University). The journal was founded by University of Chicago economist George S. Tolley, and Tolley continues to serve as an honorary editor.

== Abstracting and indexing ==
The journal is abstracted and indexed in ABI/Inform, Engineering Index, Geosystems, INSPEC, Journal of Economic Literature, RePEc, Scopus, Current Contents/Social & Behavioral Sciences, and the Social Sciences Citation Index. According to the Journal Citation Reports, the journal has a 2012 impact factor of 1.495.

== Aims and scope ==
Resource and Energy Economics publishes theoretical and empirical research in environmental and natural resource economics and energy economics. Articles are required to be firmly grounded in economic theory and to provide new insights into environmental and natural resource problems and policies, as well as analyses of energy use and energy markets that link to resource and environmental issues. The journal covers a broad range of topics such as the utilization and conservation of renewable and non-renewable resources, climate change mitigation and adaptation, innovation and the energy transition, sustainable growth and development, and international trade in relation to global environmental challenges. Additional areas of interest include non-market valuation methods, experimental and behavioural environmental economics, and the design and evaluation of environmental policy instruments.

== See also ==
- The Energy Journal
- Energy Economics
