= List of environmental social science journals =

This is a list of articles about academic journals in environmental social science.

== A ==
- Antipode
- Area

== C ==
- Case Studies in the Environment
- Children, Youth and Environments
- Conservation and Society
- Cultural Geographies

== D ==
- Disasters

== E ==
- Ecological Economics
- Ecology and Society
- Energy & Environment
- Energy Policy
- Energy Research & Social Science
- Environment and Behavior
- Environment and Planning
- Environment and Urbanization
- Environmental and Resource Economics
- Environmental Health Perspectives
- Environmental Research Letters
- Environmental Science & Technology
- Environmental Sociology
- Environmental Values

== G ==
- Geoforum
- Global Environmental Change
- Global Environmental Politics

== H ==
- Hastings West-Northwest Journal of Environmental Law and Policy
- Human Ecology

== I ==
- Indoor and Built Environment
- International Journal of Ecology & Development
- International Regional Science Review

== J ==
- The Journal of Environment & Development
- Journal of Environmental Assessment Policy and Management
- Journal of Environmental Economics and Management
- Journal of Environmental Studies and Sciences
- Journal of Environmental Psychology
- Journal of Political Ecology

== L ==
- Land Economics

== N ==
- Natural Resources Forum
- Nature and Culture

== O ==
- Organization & Environment

== P ==
- Papers in Regional Science
- Population and Environment
- Progress in Human Geography

== R ==
- Review of Environmental Economics and Policy

== S ==
- Society & Natural Resources

== W ==
- Water Resources Research

== See also ==
- List of environmental economics journals
- List of environmental journals
- List of environmental periodicals
- List of forestry journals
- List of planning journals
- Lists of academic journals
