= List of environmental economics journals =

This is a list of articles about scholarly journals in ecological, resource and environmental economics.

== A ==
- Agricultural and Resource Economics Review
- American Journal of Agricultural Economics
- Annual Review of Resource Economics
- Australian Journal of Agricultural and Resource Economics

== C ==
- Climate Change Economics
- Climate Policy

== E ==
- Ecological Economics
- Economic and Environmental Geology
- Economics of Disasters and Climate Change
- Energy Economics
- Energy Journal
- Energy Policy
- Environment and Development Economics
- Environmental and Resource Economics
- Environmental Economics
- Environmental Management
- Economics of Energy and Environmental Policy
- Environmental Science and Policy
- Journal of Environmental and Energy Economics

== G ==
- Growth and Change

== I ==
- International Journal of Ecology & Development

== J ==
- Journal of Agricultural and Applied Economics
- Journal of Agricultural and Resource Economics
- Journal of Development Economics
- Journal of Environmental Economics and Management
- Journal of Environmental Economics and Policy
- Journal of Environmental Management
- Journal of Environmental Planning and Management
- Journal of the Association of Environmental and Resource Economics
- Journal of Transport Economics and Policy
- Journal of Environmental and Energy Economics

== L ==
- Land Economics

== M ==
- Marine Resource Economics

== N ==
- Natural Resources Journal
- Natural Resource Modeling

== R ==
- Resource and Energy Economics
- Review of Environmental Economics and Policy

== W ==
- Water Resources Research

== See also ==
- List of economics journals
- List of environmental journals
- List of environmental social science journals
