= Carolyn Fischer =

Environmental economist

Carolyn Fischer is an environmental economist. She was born in Ontario, later moving to the United States. She is a senior fellow for Resources for the Future, as well as being a Canada 150 Research Chair in Climate Economics, Innovation, and Policy. She is also a professor of environmental and natural resource economics at Vrije Universiteit-Amsterdam.

== Early life and education ==
Born in Waterloo, Ontario, Fischer is the daughter of Charlotte Froese Fischer and Patrick C. Fischer. In 1997, Fischer earned a PhD in economics from the University of Michigan at Ann Arbor.

== Career ==
Fischer was a staff economist at the Council of Economic Advisers to the President from 1994 to 1995. She then went on to join Resources for the Future in 1997, where she is now a senior fellow. Dr. Fischer was an EU Marie Sklodowska-Curie Fellow from 2014 to 2016. She has also been a Marks Visiting professor at University of Gothenburg from 2017 to 2018, a Dahrendof Visiting Follow at the London School of Economics, a UCE3 Senior Fellow at the University of California Santa Barbara, and a fellow at the Center for Advanced Study of the Norwegian Academy of Science and Letters. Dr. Fischer is a consultant for the World Bank Group, a staff economist for the Council of Economic Advisors, and has taught at Johns Hopkins University.

Having previously been on the Association of Environmental and Resource Economists board of directors, Fischer is now a part of the expert advisory board for the Mercator Research Institute on Global Commons and Climate Change in Berlin, the Euro-Mediterranean Center on Climate Change, Economics for Energy, and the Environmental Defence Fund. Having become one of the world's leading environmental economists, Dr. Fischer is currently a professor and thesis supervisor at the Vrije Universiteit-Amsterdam. She is teaching environmental and natural resource economics, as well as policy instrument design. Fischer is one of 20 academics working as a Canada 150 Research Chair in Climate Economics, Innovation and Policy at the University of Ottawa. Along with being a senior fellow for Resources for the Future, Dr. Fischer is also a Tinbergen Institute affiliate, a CESifo Research Network fellow, a fellow with the European Commission at Venice's Eni Enrico Mattei foundation, and a member of Environment Canada's Economics and Environmental Policy Research Network. Fischer serves on the scientific board of Economics for Energy and the economics advisory board of the Environmental Defense Fund. She is also a part of the European Association of Environmental and Resource Economics, as both vice-president and council member. Dr. Fisher is co-editor of Environmental and Resource Economics, also on the editorial board of the Review of Environmental Economics and Policy and the International Review of Environmental and Resource Economics.

A majority of Fischer's work revolves around climate policy, including carbon pricing systems and emissions taxes. Fischer has said that she is fond of working in Canada as the federal government is a global leader regarding climate change policies, stating that “Canada has made a strong commitment to address greenhouse gas emissions...That makes it an exciting time to be working on climate policy in Canada, especially from an environmental economist’s perspective.”

== Research ==
Fischer has become a global leader in environmental economics for her research in climate change policy. She has authored over 50 academic articles on environmental economics. Her research has consistently surrounded environmental policy and modelling tools, specifically climate and energy policy. Fischer often incorporates microeconomic policy into her articles, especially when discussing environmentally and natural resource management. She has addressed a variety of topics through her research, including resource management, renewable energy, carbon leakage, cap and trade systems, and others. She has also written about energy efficiency programs, the Clean Development Mechanism, as well as international policy and trade. Regarding natural resource use and management, Fischer has written about eco-certification, wildlife conservation, invasive species, and technological innovation. Her recent research has been surrounding international trade and climate policy.

== Awards ==
Fischer has been the recipient of a 2018 prize for her work as a Canada 150 Research Chair in Climate Economics, Innovation and Policy regarding spatial economics.
