= Maureen Cropper =

American economist and academic

Maureen L. Cropper
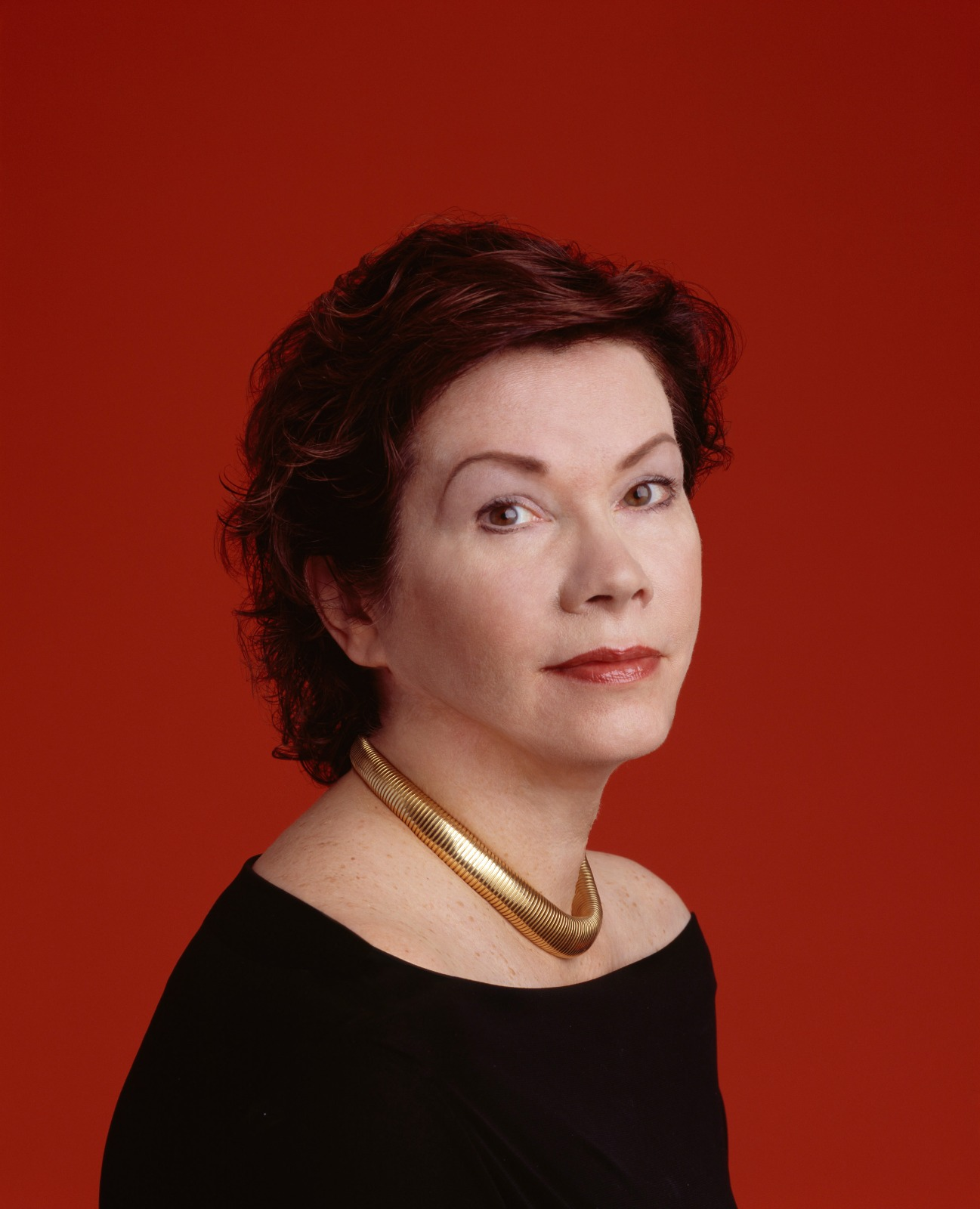
- Citizenship: United States
- Education: Bryn Mawr College; Cornell University
- Awards: Distinguished University Professor, University of Maryland, College Park, 2011; Member, National Academy of Sciences, 2008.
- Scientific career
- Fields: Economics
- Workplaces: UC Riverside; University of Southern California; University of Maryland; Resources for the Future; World Bank
- Website: https://www.econ.umd.edu/facultyprofile/Cropper/Maureen

Maureen L. Cropper is an American economist. She is a Distinguished University Professor in the Department of Economics at the University of Maryland, College Park, and a Senior Fellow at Resources for the Future (RFF). She is a member of the National Academy of Sciences and a former Lead Economist at the World Bank. Her research focuses on environmental and natural resource economics, the economics of health and safety regulations, and energy and transportation economics.

== Education ==
Cropper earned a Bachelor of Arts in Economics from Bryn Mawr College in 1969, graduating summa cum laude. She received a Master of Arts (1972) and a Doctor of Philosophy in Economics (1973) from Cornell University.

== Career ==
Cropper began her academic career as an Assistant Professor of Economics at the University of California, Riverside (1973–1978), followed by positions at the University of Southern California (1978–1980). She joined the University of Maryland in 1980 as an Assistant Professor, was promoted to Associate Professor in 1982, and became a full Professor in 1992. She served as Chair of the Department of Economics at the University of Maryland from 2012 to 2019 and was named a Distinguished University Professor in 2011.

Concurrently, Cropper has held long-standing affiliations with Resources for the Future (RFF) in Washington, D.C., where she has been a Senior Fellow since 2009. She served as a Lead Economist in the Research Department of the World Bank from 1993 to 2006. She is a Research Associate of the National Bureau of Economic Research (NBER) and a former member of the Board of Directors of NBER.

Cropper has served as chair of the U.S. Environmental Protection Agency (EPA) Science Advisory Board Environmental Economics Advisory Committee (2002–2006) and as president of the Association of Environmental and Resource Economists (1995–1996).

== Research ==
Cropper's research examines the tradeoffs involved in environmental, health, and safety regulation, with a particular focus on valuing mortality risk reductions and the application of benefit-cost analysis to public policy. According to Google Scholar, her work has been cited more than 33000 times.

Cropper's research addresses how individuals and policymakers value reductions in the risk of death. In a series of studies with Paul R. Portney and Sema K. Aydede, she examined how the public discounts future lives saved and whether the value of a statistical life varies with age. She found that willingness to pay for mortality risk reductions declines with the age of the person whose life is at risk and with the latency of the risk.

Cropper has studied the determinants and effects of environmental regulation, finding that U.S. EPA decisions on pesticides and Superfund cleanups were influenced by both health risks and regulatory costs. She also demonstrated that emissions trading under the Acid Rain Program generated substantial cost savings compared with traditional regulatory approaches.

Cropper's studies have estimated the benefits of reducing particulate matter in Delhi, analyzed the factors behind declining traffic fatalities in industrialized countries, and evaluated the effects of fuel-economy standards in India. More recently, she has investigated the mortality impacts of coal-fired power plants and the benefits of achieving national air-quality standards in India. Her work has examined how population density and public transit affect travel behavior, evaluated slum-upgrading programs in Mumbai, and analyzed the economic benefits of the Mumbai Metro.

Cropper has research affiliations at the National Bureau of Economic Research, the University of Maryland, and Resources for the Future. She has been an associate editor of the Journal of Environmental Economics and Management, the Journal of Economic Perspectives, Resource and Energy Economics, and the Journal of the Association of Environmental and Resource Economists. She has been president of the Association of Environmental and Resource Economists, and chaired the Environmental Economics Advisory Committee, and the Advisory Council on Clean Air Compliance Analysis for the U.S. Environmental Protection Agency Science Advisory Board.

== Awards and honors ==
- Member, National Academy of Sciences (2008)
- Fellow, Association of Environmental and Resource Economists (2005)
- Society for Benefit-Cost Analysis Outstanding Achievement Award (2019)
- Distinguished University Professor, University of Maryland, College Park (2011)
- T. W. Shultz Memorial Lecture and Award (2023)

== Selected works ==
- ML Cropper; WE Oates. "Environmental economics: a survey". Journal of Economic Literature. 30 (2): 675–740.
- ML Cropper; LB Deck; KE McConnell (1988). "On the choice of functional form for hedonic price functions". The Review of Economics and Statistics: 668–675.doi:10.2307/1935831
- M Cropper; C Griffiths. "The interaction of population growth and environmental quality". The American Economic Review. 84 (2): 250–254.
- * Arrow, Kenneth J.; Cropper, Maureen L.; Eads, George C.; Hahn, Robert W.; Lave, Lester B.; et al. (April 12, 1996). "Is There a Role for Benefit-Cost Analysis in Environmental, Health, and Safety Regulation?". Science. 272 (5259): 221–222. Bibcode:1996Sci...272..221A. doi:10.1126/science.272.5259.221. eISSN 1095-9203. ISSN 0036-8075. PMID 8602504.
- M Cropper; E Kopits (2005). "Why have traffic fatalities declined in industrialized countries? Implications for pedestrians and vehicle occupants". The World Bank.
- Carlson, C.; Burtraw, D.; Cropper, M. L.; Palmer, K. (2000). "Sulfur Dioxide Control by Electric Utilities: What Are the Gains from Trade?". Journal of Political Economy. 108 (6): 1292–1326.doi:10.1086/317681
- Cropper, M. L.; Cui, R.; Guttikunda, S.; et al. (2021). "The Mortality Impacts of Current and Planned Coal-Fired Power Plants in India". Proceedings of the National Academy of Sciences. 118 (5): e2017936188. doi:10.1073/pnas.2017936118
- Landrigan, P. J.; Fuller, R.; Cropper, M. L.; et al. (2018). "The Lancet Commission on Pollution and Health". The Lancet. 391 (10119): 462–512. doi:10.1016/S0140-6736(17)32345-0
- Cropper, M. L.; Sinha, P.; et al. (2026). "The Mortality and Economic Benefits of Achieving Air Pollution Standards in India". Proceedings of the National Academy of Sciences. 123 (8): e2522228123. doi:10.1073/pnas.2522228123
