= Charles Kolstad =

American economist

- Born: April 30, 1948 (age 78)

Academic background
- Education: Stanford University (Ph.D.); University of Rochester (M.A.); Bates College (B.A.)

Academic work
- Discipline: Environmental Economics
- Website: Information at IDEAS / RePEc

Charles D. Kolstad (born April 30, 1948) is an American economist, known for his work in environmental economics, environmental regulation, climate change and energy markets. He is professor and senior fellow at Stanford University (appointed in the Stanford Institute for Economic Policy Research and the Precourt Institute for Energy and the Department of Economics).

Prior to his appointment at Stanford, he was professor of economics at the University of California, Santa Barbara (UCSB), appointed to both the Bren School of Environmental Science & Management and the Department of Economics. Kolstad was also chair of the UCSB Department of Economics and co-director of the University of California Center for Energy & Environmental Economics. Previously held academic positions in Economics include University of Illinois, Harvard University, Stanford University and MIT.

== Education ==
Kolstad holds a Ph.D. from Stanford University, an M.A. in mathematics from the University of Rochester, and a B.A. in mathematics from Bates College.

== Contributions ==
Kolstad is one of two lead authors on the IPCC's Fifth Assessment Report in Working Group 3,Chapter 3: Social, Economic, and Ethical Concepts and Methods. Working Group 3 focuses on climate mitigation, and this contribution covered economic justice, expanded valuation to non-monetary costs and benefits, a discussion of cost benefit analysis methodology, and policy review. The report was published in 2014. He was jointly awarded the 2007 Nobel Peace Prize for his work in tackling climate change, alongside all IPCC co-authors and Al Gore.

His academic work has covered energy markets, regulation, and climate change - including mitigation, adaptation and impacts. His contribution to the field of environmental economics has covered the economics of coal markets, electricity markets, pollution and tax havens as well as the advancement of methodologies related to incorporating environmental externalities into cost benefit analyses and measurement of environmental damages.

Specifically, he has contributed to understanding why international coordination on environmental agreements has largely failed. His most recent work (from 2020-onward) has primarily been in reviewing climate change policies and economics, published in Science, with other well known environmental economists such as Marshall Burke (UC Berkeley), Matthew Kotchen (Yale), and Michael Greenstone (Chicago).

== Affiliations ==
Kolstad is a founding co-editor of the Review of Environmental Economics and Policy, a peer-reviewed journal of environmental economics. He is also a former president of the Association of Environmental and Resource Economists (AERE), and has authored more than 100 publications, including the undergraduate text, Environmental Economics, which has been translated into Japanese, Spanish and Chinese.

Kolstad is a Senior Expert on the California Council on Science and Technology. He is also a University Fellow at Resources for the Future in Washington DC, a Fellow of CESifo in Munich, and a Research Associate at the National Bureau of Economic Research (NBER).

== Books ==
- Kolstad, Charles D. (2010). Environmental Economics. Oxford University Press. ISBN 978-0-19-973264-7.
- Braden, John B. and Kolstad, Charles D. (1991). Measuring the Demand for Environmental Quality: Open Workshop : Revised Papers (Contributions to Economic Analysis, 198) Emerald Publishing ISBN 0444888772
