= Andreas Ortmann =

German economist

- Born: 28 January 1953 (age 73)

Academic background
- Education: Bielefeld University (BA 1980); University of Georgia (MS 1987); Texas A&M University (PhD 1991); Charles University (Dr.Habil. 2003)
- Doctoral advisor: Steven N. Wiggins; Raymond C. Battalio

Academic work
- Discipline: Experimental economics, Behavioural economics, Game theory, Industrial organisation, Public economics, History of economic thought
- Institutions: UNSW Business School (2009-present); CERGE-EI (2000-2008); Colby College (2000-2001); Bowdoin College (1991-1999)

Andreas Ortmann (born 28 January 1953 in Oerlinghausen, North Rhine-Westphalia, Germany) is a German-born economist and Professor of Experimental and Behavioural Economics at the UNSW Business School. He is best known for his work on experimental methodology in social sciences, heuristics and coordination games. Vernon L. Smith, in the acknowledgement to his A Life in Experimental Economics, described Ortmann as an "economic theorist, experimentalist, and intellectual historian par excellence in all".

== Biography ==
Ortmann was born on 28 January 1953, in Oerlinghausen, North Rhine-Westphalia, Germany. He obtained his BA in Political Economics and Mathematics from the Bielefeld University in 1980, his MS in economics from the University of Georgia under the advisory of Donald C. Keenan, Martin Hillenbrand and Janet C. Hunt in 1987, and his PhD in economics from the Texas A&M University in 1991 with a dissertation titled "Essays on Quality Uncertainty, Information, and Institutional Choice", under the advisory of Steven N. Wiggins and Raymond C. Battalio. He also completed his habilitation in Economics from the Charles University in 2003.

Ortmann took up his current position as Professor of Experimental and Behavioural Economics in the School of Economics at UNSW Business School in 2009, after having previously worked at the Bowdoin College as an Assistant Professor of Economics from 1991 to 1999, at the Colby College as a Faculty Fellow from 2000 to 2001, and at CERGE-EI (a joint workplace of Charles University and the Czech Academy of Sciences) as an assistant professor from 2000 to 2004, Associate Professor from 2004 to 2005 and Professor from 2005 to 2009. He also had spells as visiting scholar at the Yale University and Harvard Business School, and worked at the Max Planck Institute for Psychological Research and at the Max Planck Institute for Human Development.

His research interests include experimental economics, behavioural economics, game theory, industrial organisation, public economics and history of economic thought. Ortmann's notable co-authors include Gerd Gigerenzer, Daniel Goldstein, Reinhard Selten, Werner Güth, Giovanna Devetag, Pavlo Blavatskyy, Elisabet Rutström, John Van Huyck, Ralph Hertwig, Peter M. Todd, Andreas Blume, Valentyn Panchenko, Dmitry Ryvkin, Leonidas Spiliopoulos, Le (Lyla) Zhang, Dirk Engelmann, and Ben R. Newell. He was nominated for the Ig Nobel Prize for his work (with Bernhard Borges, Daniel Goldstein and Gerd Gigerenzer) on heuristics in financial markets.

== Selected publications ==
- Ortmann, A. & L. K. Tichy (1999). "Gender differences in the laboratory: Evidence from prisoner’s dilemma games". Journal of Economic Behavior and Organization, 39 (3), pp. 327–339.
- Ortmann, A.; Fitzgerald, J. & C. Boeing (2000). "Trust, reciprocity, and social history: A re-examination". Experimental Economics, 3 (1), pp. 81–100.
- Hertwig, R. & A. Ortmann (2001). "Experimental practices in economics: A methodological challenge for psychologists?". Behavioral and Brain Sciences, 24 (3), pp. 383–403.
- Hertwig, R. & A. Ortmann (2001). "Money, lies, and replicability: On the need for empirically grounded experimental practices and interdisciplinary discourse". Behavioral and Brain Sciences, 24 (3), pp. 433–444.
- Ortmann, A. & R. Hertwig (2002). "The costs of deception: Evidence from psychology". Experimental Economics, 5 (2), pp. 111–131.
- Blume, A. & A. Ortmann (2007). "The effects of costless pre-play communication: Experimental evidence from games with Pareto-ranked equilibria". Journal of Economic Theory, 132 (1), pp. 274–290.
- Devetag, G. & A. Ortmann (2007). "When and why? A critical survey on coordination failure in the laboratory". Experimental Economics, 10 (3), pp. 331–344.
- Ryvkin, D. & A. Ortmann (2008). "The predictive power of three prominent tournament formats". Management Science, 54 (3), pp. 492–504.
- Spiliopoulos, L. & A. Ortmann (2014). "Model comparisons using tournaments: Likes, "dislikes", and challenges.". Psychological Methods, 19 (2), pp. 230–250.
- Ortmann, A. (2016). "Episodes from the Early History of Experimentation in Economics". The Making of Experimental Economics, pp. 195–217.
- Dobrescu, L. I.; Fan, X.; Bateman, H.; Newell, B. R.; Ortmann, A. & S. Thorp (2018). "Retirement savings: A tale of decisions and defaults". Economic Journal, 128 (610), pp. 1047–1094.
- Spiliopoulos, L. & A. Ortmann (2018). "The BCD of response time analysis in experimental economics". Experimental Economics, 21 (2), pp. 383–433.
- Spiliopoulos, L.; Ortmann, A. & L. Zhang (2018). "Complexity, attention, and choice in games under time constraints: A process analysis.". Journal of Experimental Psychology: Learning, Memory, and Cognition, 44 (10), pp. 1609–1640.
- Ortmann, A.; Baranowski, D. & B. Walraevens (2019). "Schumpeter’s Assessment of Adam Smith and ‘The Wealth of Nations’: Why He Got It Wrong". Journal of the History of Economic Thought, 41 (4), pp. 531–551.
- Shen, P.; Betz, R.; Ortmann, A. & Gong, R. (2020). "Improving truthful reporting of polluting firms by rotating inspectors: Experimental evidence from a bribery game". Environmental and Resource Economics, 76, pp. 201–233.
- Thorp, S.; Bateman, H.; Dobrescu, L. I.; Newell, B. R. & A. Ortmann (2020). "Flicking the Switch: Simplifying Disclosure to Improve Retirement Plan Choices". Journal of Banking and Finance, 121, 105955.
- Ortmann, A. (2021). "On the Foundations of Behavioral and Experimental Economics" in Kincaid, H. & D. Ross (eds.). A Modern Guide to Philosophy of Economics (Chapter 8). Cheltenham, UK: Edward Elgar Publishing. pp. 157–181.
- Keller, E.; Newman, J.; Ortmann, A.; Jorm, L. R. & G. M. Chambers (2021). "How Much Is A Human Life Worth? A Systematic Review". Value in Health, 24 (10), pp. 1531–1541.
- Blavatskyy, P.; Ortmann, A. & V. Panchenko (2022). "On the Experimental Robustness of the Allais Paradox". American Economic Journal: Microeconomics, 14 (1), pp. 143–163.
- Ortmann, A. & B. Walraevens (2022). Adam Smith’s System. A Reinterpretation Inspired by Smith’s Lectures on Rhetoric, Game Theory, and Conjectural History. Palgrave Macmillan. London, UK.
- Blavatskyy, P.; Panchenko, V. & A. Ortmann (2023). "How common is the common-ratio effect?". Experimental Economics, 26 (1), pp. 253–272.
- Ortmann, A. & L. Spiliopoulos (2023). "Ecological rationality and economics: Where the twain shall meet". Synthese, 201 (4), p. 135.
- Keller, E.; Ortmann, A. & G. M. Chambers (2024). "Exploring the demand for elective egg freezing: A laboratory experiment". Journal of Behavioral and Experimental Economics, 111 (4), 102224.
