= Chicoine =

Chicoine is a surname. Notable people with the surname include:

- Dan Chicoine (born 1957), Canadian ice hockey player
- David L. Chicoine, American university administrator and businessman
- Roland A. Chicoine (1922–2016), American politician
- Sylvain Chicoine (born 1970), Canadian politician
