= Richard Newell =

Richard Newell may refer to:

- King Biscuit Boy (Richard A. Newell), Canadian blues musician
- Dick Newell (Richard G. Newell), British businessman and technologist
- Richard G. Newell (born 1965), American energy and climate economist

== See also ==
- Rick Newell (Gordon Richard Newell), Canadian ice hockey player
