= JEEM =

Jeem or JEEM may refer to:

- Arabic letter ǧīm ﺝ
- Jeem TV formerly Al Jazeera Children's Channel
- Journal of Environmental Economics and Management
- Journal of Embryology and Experimental Morphology
