= National Energy Education Development Project =

- Abbreviation: NEED Project
- Formation: 1980
- Headquarters: Manassas, VA, USA
- CEO: Mary Spruill
- Website: http://www.need.org

The National Energy Education Development Project (NEED) is a non-profit education association that designs and delivers energy education programs. The NEED Project's educator network includes over 65,000 classrooms nationwide that use NEED's annually up-dated curriculum materials.

== The NEED Project beginnings ==
Started in 1980, launched by a Congressional resolution spearheaded by Gerard Katz, a New York state physics teacher, the National Energy Education Development Project (NEED) is a non-profit education association.

On March 20, 1980, President Jimmy Carter signed Proclamation 4738, entitled "National Energy Education Day: By the President of the United States, A Proclamation." The proclamation read, in part:

There are only two ways that we can reduce the imports of oil from foreign countries. One is to increase production of American energy of all kinds—and we have been blessed with tremendous reserves compared to other nations—and the other is to conserve the energy supplies that we have from all sources. We have made some progress. It has not yet been adequate, but it's been steady. We've more than reduced imports by a million barrels a day—and we expect to make even greater progress this year—since I've been in office, in 1977.

One of the major opportunities that has not yet been explored is to educate our young people—who can be just as effective, perhaps even more so, than many adults—in the facts about energy, what the opportunities are for conservation, and how they themselves can help. In homes, on the job, in transportation—there is a tremendous opportunity not only for young people to learn but also to educate their parents about the facts concerning how we can solve our energy problem through conservation.

A recent analysis has shown that there is an abysmal lack of information within the public school system among the students about basic facts concerning energy. And this designation of a national day for energy education is a very worthwhile commitment because of the facts that I've just described...

The NEED program includes curriculum materials, professional development, evaluation tools, and recognition. NEED teaches the scientific concepts of energy and provides objective information about conventional and emerging energy sources, their use, and their impact on the environment, economy, and society. The program also educates students about energy efficiency and conservation, while providing tools to help educators, energy managers, and consumers use energy wisely.

== NEED's curriculum ==
NEED materials are available for all grade levels from kindergarten through high school and beyond. With NEED's extensive curriculum, educators can design classroom programs that spark the interest of their students and meet course objectives. NEED materials are designed to meet and correlate to the National Science Education Content Standards, as well as many state science standards.

NEED materials are updated annually using the latest data from the U.S. Energy Information Administration, as well as from a wide range of energy industry partners. NEED works with educators and students to improve existing materials and develop new ones to meet national and state curriculum requirements. In a special partnership with the Energy Information Administration, NEED helps make energy information and data available to students via the EIA Kids' Page website. NEED welcomes partners who vitalize the NEED network with new curriculum materials and new schools.

== Training and professional development ==
Training is offered at local, state, regional and national levels. During the school year, NEED coordinators, lead teachers, and student leaders facilitate workshops for teachers, students, parents, and community members that may range from a few hours to several days. At these workshops, attendees receive an introduction to the NEED curriculum. Additional training for special topics like solar, hydrogen, wind, energy on public lands, or energy management is available in many areas of the NEED network. NEED specializes in creating a first-class training experience, which is consistently scored by participants as one of the best professional development experiences available.

In the summer, the National Energy Conferences for Educators give teachers and energy professionals the opportunity to meet other educators from across the country, design and develop NEED units for their classrooms, increase their energy knowledge, and earn graduate credit. They participate in NEED activities and field trips to energy sites such as nuclear power plants, coal mines, offshore oil production facilities, solar energy facilities, hydroelectric dams, and energy efficiency projects.

NEED sponsors and partners provide sponsorship for teachers, and they participate as speakers and field trip guides. Some NEED states also sponsor summer energy camps for kids, spring break day camps, and overnight energy weekends. Many NEED schools work with scout troops and community youth groups to help them gain energy-related merit badges and community service hours.
