= Charlotte Froese Fischer =

Canadian-American applied mathematician and computer scientist

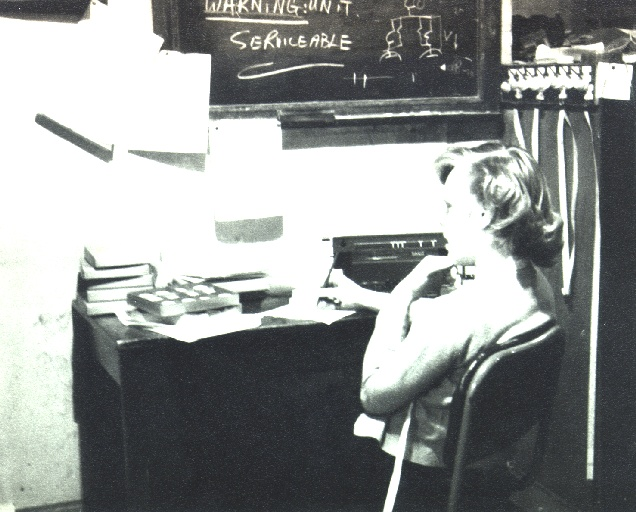
- Fischer at EDSAC
- Born: Charlotte Froese; September 21, 1929; Stara Mykolaivka, Donetsk, Ukraine
- Died: February 8, 2024 (aged 94); Maryland, U.S.
- Education: University of British Columbia; University of Cambridge
- Spouse: Patrick C. Fischer (m. 1967; died 2011)
- Awards: Sloan Research Fellowship; Fellow of the American Physical Society; Member, Royal Physiographic Society in Lund; Fulbright Senior Research Award; Foreign Member, Lithuanian Academy of Sciences; Honorary Doctorate, Malmö University; Fellow of the Royal Society of Canada; Honorary Doctorate, University of Western Ontario
- Scientific career
- Workplaces: University of British Columbia; Harvard College Observatory; Vanderbilt University; National Institute of Standards and Technology
- Doctoral advisor: Douglas Hartree

Charlotte Froese Fischer (September 21, 1929 – February 8, 2024) was a Canadian-American applied mathematician, computer scientist and physicist noted for the development and implementation of the Multi-Configurational Hartree–Fock (MCHF) approach to atomic-structure calculations and its application to the description of atomic structure and spectra.

The experimental discovery of the negative ion of calcium was motivated by her theoretical prediction of its existence. This was the first known anion of a Group 2 element. Its discovery was cited in Froese Fischer's election to Fellow of the American Physical Society.

== Early life ==
Charlotte Froese was born on September 21, 1929, in the village of Stara Mykolaivka (formerly Pravdivka, and Nikolayevka), in the Donetsk region, in the present-day Ukraine, to parents of Mennonite descent. Her parents immigrated to Germany in 1929 on the train to cross the border. After a few months in a refugee camp, her family was allowed to immigrate to Canada, where they eventually established themselves in Chilliwack, British Columbia.

== Education and research ==
She obtained both a B.A. degree, with honors, in Mathematics and Chemistry and an M.A. degree in Applied Mathematics from the University of British Columbia in 1952 and 1954, respectively. She then obtained her Ph.D. in Applied Mathematics and Computing at Cambridge University in 1957, pursuing coursework in quantum theory with Paul Dirac. She worked under the supervision of Douglas Hartree, whom she assisted in programming the Electronic Delay Storage Automatic Calculator (EDSAC) for atomic-structure calculations.

She served on the mathematics faculty of the University of British Columbia from 1957 till 1968, where she introduced numerical analysis and computer courses into the curriculum and was instrumental in the formation of the Computer Science Department. Froese Fischer spent 1963-64 at the Harvard College Observatory, where she extended her research on atomic-structure calculations. While at Harvard, she was the first woman scientist to be awarded an Alfred P. Sloan Fellowship. In 1991 she became a Fellow of the American Physical Society, in part for her contribution to the discovery of negative calcium. In 1995 she was elected a member of the Royal Physiographic Society in Lund, in 2004 a foreign member of the Lithuanian Academy of Sciences, and in 2015 she was awarded an Honorary Doctorate in Technology from Malmö University, Sweden.

== Contributions ==
Froese Fischer was the author of over 300 research articles on computational atomic theory, many of which have had far-reaching impact in the area of atomic-structure calculations. The early version of her MCHF program, published in the first volume of Computer Physics Communications received two Citation Classics Awards in 1987. She authored an influential monograph on Hartree-Fock approaches to the first-principles calculation of atomic structure, and coauthored a substantial successor work. One of her largest efforts in the field is the calculation of the complete lower spectra of the beryllium-like to argon-like isoelectronic sequences, amounting to the publication of data covering 400 journal pages and a total of over 150 ions. She also authored a scientific biography of her Ph.D. thesis advisor, Douglas Hartree. Froese Fischer is the highest cited author in computational atomic physics, with over 22,000 citations on her work.

Froese Fischer was a research professor of computer science at Vanderbilt University and a Guest Scientist in the Atomic Spectroscopy Group at NIST. An autobiographical account of her own life up to the year 2000 was published in Molecular Physics, and a biographical review of her scientific work up to 2019 has been published in Atoms. She died on February 8, 2024 at her home in Maryland.

== Personal life ==
Froese Fischer was married to Patrick C. Fischer, himself a noted computer scientist and professor at Vanderbilt, from 1967 until his death in 2011. Together, they are survived by their daughter, environmental economist Carolyn Fischer.
