= Richard G. Newell =

9th Administrator of the Energy Information Administration

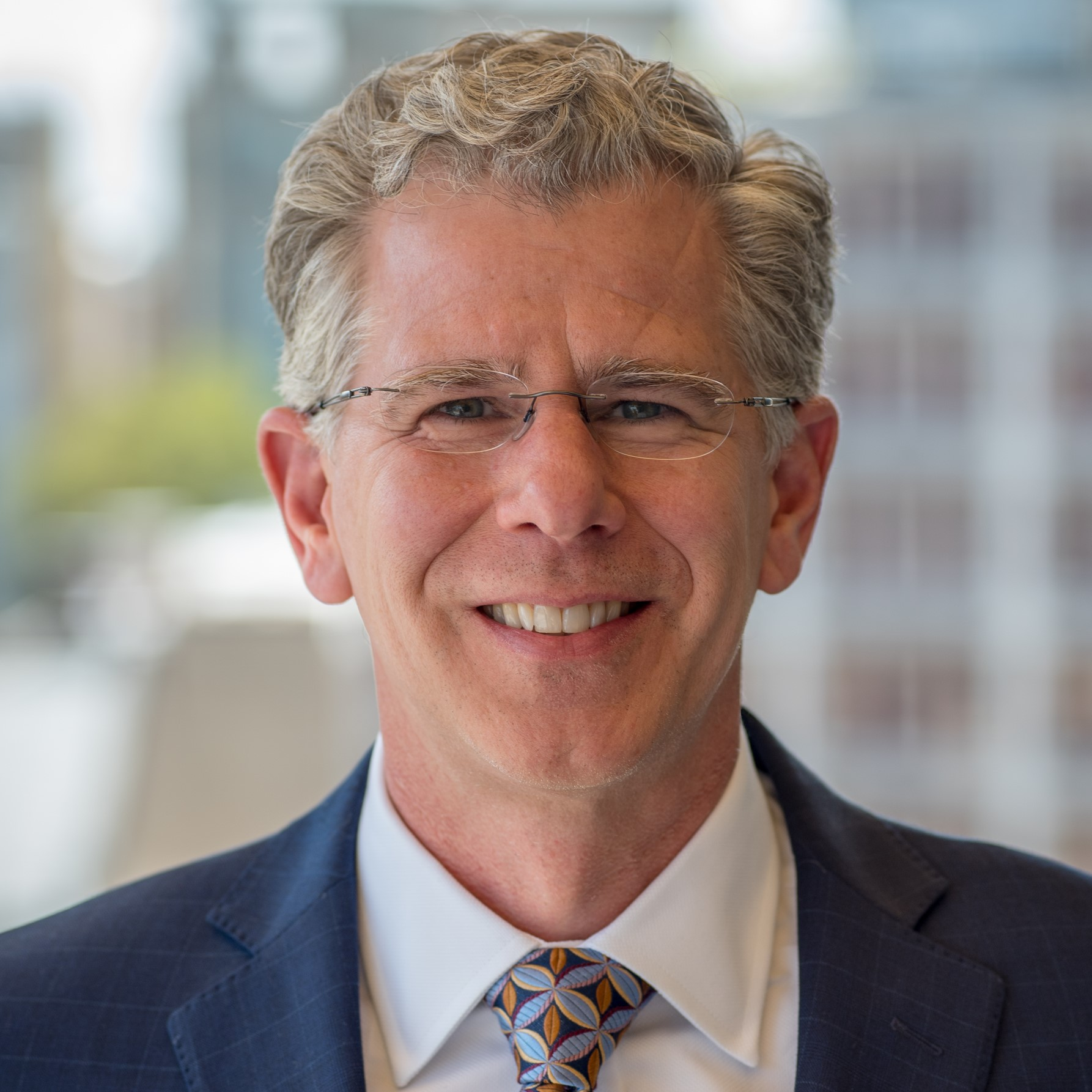

7th Administrator of the Energy Information Administration
- In office August 3, 2009 – July 1, 2011
- President: Barack Obama
- Preceded by: Guy Caruso
- Succeeded by: Adam Sieminski

Personal details
- Born: 1965 (age 60–61)
- Education: Rutgers University (BA); Rutgers University (BS); Princeton University (MPA); Harvard University (PhD)

Richard G. Newell (born 1965) is an American energy economist, environmental economist, and climate policy expert who served as the seventh administrator of the United States Energy Information Administration from 2009 to 2011. He was also once the president and CEO of Resources for the Future, a nonprofit environmental economics research and policy institute in Washington, D.C. He has previously served as Senior Economist for Energy and Environment on the President's Council of Economic Advisers and as Professor of Energy and Environmental Economics at Duke University.

Newell is often cited as an authority on climate, energy, and environmental policy issues in major media outlets like the Financial Times, The New York Times, The Wall Street Journal, The Washington Post, NPR, and C-SPAN. He has testified on multiple occasions in the United States Senate and House of Representatives. He has been described by former US secretary of energy Steven Chu as "a leading expert on the economics of energy and environmental markets, policies, and technologies".

== Early life and education ==
Newell earned a Ph.D. from Harvard University in 1997 in public policy, specializing in environmental and resource economics. Newell holds an MPA from the Princeton School of Public and International Affairs, as well as a BS in materials engineering and a BA in philosophy from Rutgers University.

== Career ==
In the 1990s and early 2000s, Newell was a senior associate at the global advisory and digital services provider ICF International, a teaching fellow at Harvard University, and a senior fellow at Resources for the Future. During 2005–2006, Newell served as Senior Economist for Energy and Environment on the President's Council of Economic Advisers, where he worked with chairman Ben Bernanke, providing economic analysis on issues including energy market disruptions, energy innovation, automobile fuel economy, and renewable fuels. Newell later joined Duke University as the Gendell Professor of Energy and Environmental Economics at the Nicholas School of the Environment. There, he taught from 2007 to 2016, and in 2011 also became a professor in the university's economics department. Newell founded and directed the Duke University Energy Initiative and directed the university's Energy Data Analytics Lab.

Newell took a leave of absence from the university when he was confirmed by the Senate as the seventh administrator of the U.S. Energy Information Administration (EIA) after being nominated by President Barack Obama. He held the position from August 3, 2009 to July 1, 2011. In the role, he was responsible for directing responsible collection, analysis, and dissemination of unbiased energy information to promote sound policymaking by the United States government. Newell left Duke University in 2016, but remained an adjunct professor at the Nicholas School.

In 2016, Newell became the president and CEO of the Washington, D.C.-based environmental economics think tank, Resources for the Future. He previously worked as a senior fellow at the organization from 1997 to 2006 and has served on its board of directors since 2011. His research work at the organization covers climate policy, energy innovation, the social cost of carbon, energy efficiency, energy markets, and global energy outlooks.

== Testimony, Analysis, and Commentary ==
Newell has testified on multiple occasions in front of the United States Senate Committee on Energy and Natural Resources, most recently on global climate emissions trends and clean energy advancements. He has also testified in front of the United States Senate Committee on Agriculture, Nutrition, and Forestry, the United States House Committee on Natural Resources, and the United States House Energy Subcommittee on Energy. He has been cited in The New York Times on the impacts of the US withdrawal from the Paris Agreement and the impacts of Trump administration energy policy.

Newell co-chaired the multi-disciplinary committee formed by the National Academy of Sciences to inform revisions to estimates of the social cost of carbon. He has been cited as an authority on the social cost of carbon in media outlets like Bloomberg News, the Financial Times, and The New York Times, and published commentaries on it in Barron's.

He has also written about the global energy transition for Axios. His analysis on this subject has featured prominently in the Financial Times, which described it as "thought provoking":

[Newell] argued that "there has never been an energy transition" because, as each new technology has emerged, it has merely added to older sources, rather than replacing them.

— Ed Crooks, Financial Times

Newell goes on that “To avoid the worst impacts of climate change, the story of energy requires a new script. A true energy transition will be a story of addition but also one of subtraction—in particular, reducing carbon emissions.”

== Notable Research, Awards, and Memberships ==
Newell has published widely on topics such as energy innovation, climate policy, and energy efficiency. Newell was awarded the USAEE Adelman-Frankel Award from the US Association for Energy Economics in 2018 for contributions to the field of energy economics. His 2002 paper, "The Induced Innovation Hypothesis and Energy-Saving Technological Change," earned the 2017 Publication of Enduring Quality Award from the Association of Environmental and Resource Economists. His 2003 paper, "Discounting the Distant Future: How Much Do Uncertain Rates Increase Valuations?" was awarded the 2006 Petry Prize for the Economics of Climate Change, and later informed estimation methods for the social cost of carbon.

Newell has been a research associate at the National Bureau of Economic Research and a member of the USAEE, American Economics Association, and Association of Environmental and Resource Economics. He has served on advisory boards of the National Academy of Sciences and other institutions.
