= Glenn W. Harrison =

Australian economist (born 1955)

- Born: 11 March 1955 (age 71)

Academic background
- Education: Monash University (BA 1976 and MA 1978) University of California, Los Angeles (MA 1980 and PhD 1982)
- Doctoral advisor: Robert W. Clower

Academic work
- Discipline: Experimental economics, Econometrics, Environmental economics, Resource economics, International trade policy
- Institutions: Georgia State University; Monash University (2011–present); Durham University (2007–2010); University of Central Florida (2003–2009); University of South Carolina (1990–2003)
- Website: Information at IDEAS / RePEc

Glenn W. Harrison (born 11 March 1955) is an Australian economist who is the C.V. Starr Chair of Risk Management & Insurance and Director of the Center for the Economic Analysis of Risk in the Department of Risk Management & Insurance, J. Mack Robinson College of Business, Georgia State University.

== Biography ==
Harrison is a former Australian rules footballer who played with Hawthorn in the Victorian Football League in the period 1975–1976. He obtained his BA and MA in economics from the Monash University in 1976 and 1978, respectively, and an MA and PhD in economics from the University of California, Los Angeles in 1980 and 1982, respectively. The title of his doctoral dissertation was "Studies in Economic Theory and Method" under advisory of Robert W. Clower.

His research interests include risk perception, risk management, behavioral economics, experimental economics, behavioral finance and development economics, while his teaching interests span the fields of microeconomics, econometrics, behavioral Finance, game theory, industrial organisation, environmental economics, international trade and development economics. Harrison's work in experimental economics focuses on market contestability and regulation, bargaining behavior and has recently included study on the complementarity of laboratory and field experiments; while his work in law and economics has been centred on the calculations of compensatory damages in tobacco litigation as well as the relationship between compensatory damages and excessive promotion of certain drugs.

He has also been a consultant for numerous government agencies and private bodies, including the World Bank in evaluating trade policy reforms for developing countries, United States Environmental Protection Agency and the Government of Sweden in valuating carbon tax proposals, the Cabinet of Denmark in evaluating tax and deregulation policies as well as counsel representing parties suing tobacco and drug companies for economic damages.

Harrison is married and has one daughter.

== Selected publications ==
- Harrison, G. W. (1989). "Theory and misbehavior of first-price auctions ". The American Economic Review, 79 (4), pp. 749–762.
- Cummings, R. G.; Harrison, G. W. & E. E. Rutström (1995). "Homegrown values and hypothetical surveys: is the dichotomous choice approach incentive-compatible?". The American Economic Review, 85 (1), pp. 260–266.
- Harrison, G. W.; Lau, M. I. & M. B. Williams (2002). "Estimating individual discount rates in Denmark: A field experiment". The American Economic Review, 92 (5), pp. 1606–1617.
- Harrison, G. W. & J. A. List (2004). "Field experiments ". Journal of Economic Literature, 42 (4), pp. 1009–1055.
- Andersen, S.; Harrison, G. W.; Lau, M. I. & E. E. Rutström (2008). "Eliciting risk and time preferences". Econometrica, 76 (3), pp. 583–618.
