= Environmental Values =

- Discipline: Ecological economics, environmental ethics, environmental studies, human geography, environmental politics
- Language: English
- Edited by: Tom Greaves

Publication details
- History: 1992-present
- Publisher: White Horse Press (United Kingdom)
- Frequency: Bimonthly
- Impact factor: 2.158 (2019)

Standard abbreviations
- ISO 4: Environ. Values

Indexing
- CODEN: ENVLE7
- ISSN: 0963-2719 (print); 1752-7015 (web)
- LCCN: sn92032073
- OCLC no.: 25598903

Links
- Journal homepage; Online access

Environmental Values started as a quarterly peer-reviewed academic journal closely associated with the ecological economics movement, but is also firmly based in applied ethics. Subjects covered include philosophy, economics, politics, sociology, geography, anthropology, ecology, and other disciplines, all of which relate to the present and future environment of human beings and other species. The journal was established in 1992 and was edited by Alan Holland until 2007, when Clive L. Spash became editor-in-chief. Spash left the post in 2021, having served the journal in various roles (referee, review editor, associate editor, editor-in-chief) over three decades. The current editor is Tom Greaves.

In 2013, the journal expanded to six issues a year. This was a result of increasing popularity and standing in the field. According to the Journal Citation Reports, the journal had a 2015 impact factor of 1.311, ranking it 14th out of 51 journals in the category "Ethics".

Topics covered include aesthetics, biodiversity loss and management, synthetic biology, degrowth, ethical treatment of animals, future generations, human-induced climate change, geoengineering, economic valuation, market economics, preferences, rights, responsibilities, risk, and uncertainty.

== See also ==
- List of environmental social science journals
- List of ethics journals
