= Environmental social science =

Interaction of humans with the environment

Environmental social science is the broad, transdisciplinary study of interrelations between humans and the natural environment. Environmental social scientists work within and between the fields of anthropology, communication studies, economics, geography, history, political science, psychology, and sociology; and also in the interdisciplinary fields of environmental studies, human ecology and political ecology, social epidemiology, among others.

== Ideologies, fields and concepts ==
Ideologies, fields, and concepts in environmental social science aim to convey how environmental issues are intertwined with societal relations, institutions, and human activities that continually shape the environment or are themselves shaped by it. For example, political ecology is based on the premise that the environment is not apolitical. Therefore, how it is managed, who has access to the environment, and how environmental resources are distributed are shaped by political structures, power relations, economic institutions, and social processes.

Paul Robbins conveys this in his differentiation of 'apolitical' versus political ecologies. According to Robbins, political ecology emphasizes identifying "broader systems rather than blaming proximate and local forces; between viewing ecological systems as power-laden rather than politically inert; and between taking an explicitly normative approach rather than one that claims the objectivity of disinterest". Human-environmental relations reverberate through "the system" (politics, economics, power relations) moving through an entire web of human relations and structures that are intertwined in ecological relations. Therefore, environmental social scientists stress human–environmental relationships.

Another idea that has risen to prominence in environmental social science in light of this, is the idea of "environmental justice" which connects issues in the field of social justice with issues related to the environment. In describing environmental justice, the concepts emphasized by Shoreman-Ouimet and Kopnina include "equity equality, and rights issues in relation to both social and ecological actors". This pans out in debates about environmental vulnerability and the unequal distribution of resources. Here lies the idea that certain groups are made more vulnerable to "environmental burdens" while others gain more access to "environmental benefits" as defined in terms of environmental resources and services.

In further attempts to understand human-environmental relationships, environmental social science disciplines have begun to explore relationships between humans and non-humans, to understand how both interact within the natural world -- interactions that force the reconceptualization of identity as ecocultural. Ideas related to exploring human and animal interactions within the natural world have become prominent in environmental ethics. Shoreman-Ouimet and Kopnina define environment ethics as "a sub-discipline of philosophy that deals with the ethical problems surrounding the environment, in some cases providing ethical justification and moral motivation for the cause of environmental protection or for considerations of animal welfare".

This has culminated in debates regarding environmental value and moral rights and who within the larger ecosystem should be assigned these rights. Environmental ethics explores the dialectic between human and nature, exploring how the human configuration of nature may in turn reshape humans, their relationships, and their conditions. Ideas that have emerged from the questions seeking to examine this dialectic include those of "post-domesticity and domesticity". Domesticity refers to societal dynamics produced in societies in which humans have daily contact with animals other than pets.

In contrast, in post-domesticity, people are quite distant from the animals they consume. In reference to Bulliet (2005), Emel and Neo convey that the distance from witnessing the processes that govern animal life, including births and deaths, while consuming animals as food, affects people differently than continuous interaction with animals. They mention that post-domesticity may produce feelings of guilt however the continued distance between animal life brought by interacting with animals as a commodity may cause people to only distantly relate to them or think of them as packages in a store disassociating them from the life-cycles they embody.

Therefore, environmental science has paved the way to multiple concepts, ideas and paradigms that differ among each other. Still, all seek to intertwine environmental issues with other fields and issues in the social sciences.

== Social epidemiology ==
Social epidemiologists study how SES (socioeconomic status) shapes unequal access to resources such as income and prestige, which can lead to stratification in health and quality of life. Often, their investigations relate to the social determinants of health which the Centers for Disease Control and Prevention (CDC) reports as the "conditions in the places where people live, learn, work, and play ... that affect a wide range of health risks and outcomes". These epidemiologists must work in conjunction with environmental social scientists to understand the significance of different environments' effects on humans. Such work influences environmental and public health policies to improve living standards globally. The Fifth European Ministerial Conference on Environment and Health agreed to work on improving low-income housing conditions through new urban planning, health equity, and environmental justice policies, with a specific focus on preventing children from being exposed to significant environmental health risks.

Certain environments' affects on humans provides trends that social epidemiologists can investigate to determine if they are related to a divide of social status especially if only a certain part of the population is negatively affected. Epidemiology uses a host-agent-environment triangle framework to understand why humans are falling ill, and this three-pronged approach allows social epidemiologists to explore how the environment contributes to declines in health status within a subsection of the population or the entire population. It promotes the idea that the social, cultural, economic, political and environmental factors are all important factors to be considered, and health impact assessments (HIA) recommended by social epidemiologists working with environment social scientists are effectively making positive changes in the environment.

The World Health Organization (WHO) worked with its members to compose the Strategic Environmental Assessment (SEA) protocol in 2001 to ensure health impact assessments would be made with environmental assessments for policies relating to bettering the quality of life especially within low socioeconomic communities all around the world. As the environment can create stressors that are factors (i.e. low quality housing in areas of high pollution) that limit the quality of life of millions of people globally, environmental social scientists work collaboratively with the data social epidemiologists investigate and provide to understand the relationship between health status and environmental issues.

== See also ==
- Climate justice
- Coupled human–environment system
- Human impact on the environment
- List of environmental social science journals
- List of environmental studies topics
- Social science
- Women and the environment
