= David L. Chicoine =

David L. Chicoine is an American university administrator and businessman.

== Biography ==
=== Early life ===
David Chicoine was born in Elk Point, South Dakota. He graduated from South Dakota State University, where he was a member of Lambda Chi Alpha fraternity. He also received an M.S. from the University of Delaware, an M.A. from Western Illinois University, and a Ph.D. from the University of Illinois at Urbana-Champaign.

=== Career ===
He was head of the Department of Agricultural Economics and Dean of the College of Agriculture, Consumer and Environmental Sciences at the University of Illinois at Urbana-Champaign. From 2001 to 2006, he served as senior officer for technology commercialization and economic development for the Urbana-Champaign, and for six months as interim vice president for academic affairs. He served on the board of directors of the John Warner Bank, the Carle Foundation Hospital, the Farm Foundation, the DuPage International Technology Park, the Illinois Technology Development Fund, and the Argonne National Laboratory.

He served as the president of South Dakota State University from January 1, 2007. until 2016. He has served as a director on the board of directors of Monsanto since April 15, 2009, and sits on the board of directors of First Bank & Trust, Brookings, SD.

He sits on the board of trustees of the Avera McKennan Hospital and the University Health Center. He is a Knight of the National Order of Merit of France, and he has received the United States Department of Agriculture Superior Service Award and the Distinguished Alumnus Award from the SDSU Department of Economics.

=== Personal life ===
He is married to Marcia Chicoine, and they have a son, Josh, who lives in Chicago.

== Bibliography ==
=== Academic articles ===
- Chicoine, David L. (August 1981). "Farmland values at the urban fringe: an analysis of sale prices". Land Economics. 57 (3): 353–362. doi:10.2307/3146016. JSTOR 3146016.
- Chicoine, David L.; Sonka, Steven T.; Doty, Robert D. (November 1982). "The effects of farm property tax relief programs on farm financial conditions". Land Economics. 58 (4): 516–523. doi:10.2307/3145697. JSTOR 3145697.
- Chicoine, David L.; Doty, Robert D.; Sonka, Steven T. (1983). "Agricultural use-valuation using farm level data". Property Tax Journal. 2: 1–12.
- Chicoine, David L.; Hendricks, A. Donald (May 1985). "Evidence on farm use value assessment, tax shifts, and state school aid". American Journal of Agricultural Economics. 67 (2): 266–270. doi:10.2307/1240678. JSTOR 1240678.
- Chicoine, David L.; Mandelbaum, Thomas B. (1986). "The effect of time frame in the estimation of employment multipliers". Journal of Regional Analysis and Policy. 16 (1): 37–52. Archived from the original on 2015-09-06. Pdf.
- Chicoine, David L.; Walzer, Norman (January 1986). "Factors affecting property tax reliance: additional evidence". Public Choice. 49 (1): 17–28. doi:10.1007/BF00163528. JSTOR 30024611. S2CID 154049987.
- Chicoine, David L.; Ramamurthy, Ganapathi (February 1986). "Evidence on the specification of price in the study of domestic water demand". Land Economics. 62 (1): 26–32. doi:10.2307/3146560. JSTOR 3146560.
- Chicoine, David L.; Deller, Steven C.; Ramamurthy, Ganapathi (October 1986). "Instrumental variables approach to rural water service demand". Southern Economic Journal. 53 (2): 333–346. doi:10.2307/1059417. JSTOR 1059417.
- Chicoine, David L.; Deller, Steven C.; Walzer, Norman (August 1988). "Economies of size and scope in rural low-volume roads". The Review of Economics and Statistics. 70 (3): 459–465. doi:10.2307/1926784. JSTOR 1926784.
- Chicoine, David L.; Deller, Steven C.; Walzer, Norman (Winter 1989). "The size efficiency of rural governments: the case of low-volume rural roads". Publius. 19 (1): 127–138. doi:10.1093/oxfordjournals.pubjof.a037759. JSTOR 3330568.
- Chicoine, David L.; Deller, Steven C. (1989). "Economic diversification and the rural economy: evidence from consumer behavior". Journal of Regional Analysis and Policy. 19 (2): 41–55. Archived from the original on 2015-09-06. Pdf.
- Chicoine, David L.; Deller, Steven C.; Walzer, Norman (January 1989). "Representative vs. direct democracy and government spending in a median voter model". Public Finance (Finances Publiques). 44 (2): 225–236.
- Chicoine, David L.; Kolvalli, Shashi (March 1989). "Groundwater markets in Gujarat, India". International Journal of Water Resources Development. 5 (1): 38–44. Bibcode:1989IJWRD...5...38K. doi:10.1080/07900628908722410.
- Chicoine, David L.; Deller, Steven C. (January 1993). "Representative versus direct democracy: a test of allocative efficiency in local government expenditures". Public Finance Review. 21 (1): 100–114. doi:10.1177/109114219302100105. S2CID 153542099.
- Chicoine, David L.; Sonka, Steven T. (December 2004). "Value and university innovation". American Journal of Agricultural Economics. 86 (5): 1337–1344. doi:10.1111/j.0002-9092.2004.00686.x. JSTOR 3697950.

=== Books ===
- Chicoine, David L.; Walzer, Norman (1981). Financing state and local governments in the 1980s: issues and trends. Cambridge, Massachusetts: Oelgeschlager, Gunn & Hain. ISBN 9780899461090.
- Chicoine, David L.; Walzer, Norman (1984). Financing rural roads and bridges in the Midwest. Washington, D.C.: Office of Transportation and Agricultural Marketing Services, U.S. Dept. of Agriculture via Praeger. OCLC 12800602.
- Chicoine, David L.; Walzer, Norman (1985). Governmental structure and local public finance. Boston, Massachusetts: Oelgeschlager, Gunn & Hain. ISBN 9780899461878.
- Chicoine, David L.; Walzer, Norman (1986). Financing local infrastructure in nonmetropolitan areas. New York: Praeger. ISBN 9780275923754.
- Chicoine, David L.; Walzer, Norman (1986). Financing economic development in the 1980s: issues and trends. New York: Praeger. ISBN 9780275921286.
- Chicoine, David L.; Giertz, J. Fred (1986). Property tax assessment in Illinois: structure and performance. Springfield, Illinois: Illinois Tax Foundation. OCLC 15726964.
- Chicoine, David L. (1986), "Infrastructure and agriculture: interdependencies with a focus on local roads in the North Central States", in Korsching, Peter F.; Gildner, Judith (eds.), Interdependencies of agriculture and rural communities in the twenty-first century: The North Central Region: conference proceedings, Ames, Iowa: North Central Regional Center for Rural Development, pp. 141–163, OCLC 14768277.
- Chicoine, David L.; Walzer, Norman (1989). Rural roads and bridges: a dilemma for local officials. Washington, D.C.: Office of Transportation, U.S. Dept. of Agriculture. OCLC 27748207.
