= Indoor and Built Environment =

- Discipline: Environmental studies, built environment, architectural engineering, environmental engineering, environmental health
- Language: English
- Edited by: Chuck Yu

Publication details
- Former name: Indoor Environment
- History: 1992-present
- Publisher: SAGE Publications
- Frequency: 8/year
- Impact factor: 1.716 (2013)

Standard abbreviations
- ISO 4: Indoor Built Environ.

Indexing
- CODEN: IBENFP
- ISSN: 1420-326X (print); 1423-0070 (web)
- LCCN: sn96039455
- OCLC no.: 44723764

Links
- Journal homepage; Online access; Online archive

Indoor and Built Environment is a peer-reviewed academic journal covering any topic pertaining to the quality of the indoor and built environment and how this affects the efficiency, performance, health, and comfort of those living or working there. Topics range from urban infrastructure, design of buildings, and materials used for laboratory studies including building airflow simulations and health effects. The editor-in-chief is Chuck Yu (EnviroAct Consultants). It was established in 1992 by consultants to the tobacco company Philip Morris, and is published by SAGE Publications.

== Criticism ==
A 2005 study in The Lancet found that between 1992 and 2002 Indoor and Built Environment was influenced by the tobacco industry. It was found that up to 61% of articles on indoor smoke published by the journal reached industry-positive conclusions, with up to 90% of these articles having at least one author with a history of association with the industry.

Originally, the journal was funded by the International Society of the Built Environment (ISBE) and was published by Karger Publishers from 1992 to 2002. ISBE was closed in 2002 and re-launched in 2009 as a limited company by guarantee as a "Community Interest Company" - a not for profit company. The journal, Indoor Environment, was renamed Indoor and Built Environment in 1996 by John Hoskins, who was editor-in-chief of the journal from 1994 to March 2009.

== Abstracting and indexing ==
The journal is abstracted and indexed in Chemical Abstracts Service, Engineered Materials Abstracts, Scopus, and the Science Citation Index Expanded. According to the Journal Citation Reports, the journal has a 2013 impact factor of 1.716, ranking it 7th out of 56 journals in the category "Construction & Building Technology" 22nd out of 44 journals in the category "Engineering, Environmental", and 75th out of 160 journals in the category "Public, Environmental & Occupational Health".
