= Elisabet Rutström =

Swedish-born experimental economist

Eva Elisabet Rutström
- Education: Bachelor of Economics and Business Administration (1981) Ph.D. in Economics (1990)
- Occupation: Experimental Economist
- Website: sites.google.com/view/erutstrom/home

Eva Elisabet Rutström is a Swedish born experimental economist, and an accomplished field researcher in individual decision making and interactive group behaviors. Over the last 40 years she has worked as an instructor and researcher at universities in Canada, the United States, and Sweden. She currently serves as the program director of field experiments at Georgia State University’s Robinson College of Business.

== Education ==
Elisabet Rutström graduated from the Stockholm School of Economics in 1981, with a Bachelor of Economics and Business Administration. In 1990, she received her PhD in economics, also from the Stockholm School of Economics, and completed her thesis on “The Political Economy of Protectionism in Indonesia”.

During her time in school she received multiple scholarships, including the L. Fraenckel & C. Silfven Scholarship for Studies Abroad (1983–84), and the Scholarship for Research Abroad (1984–85). Rutström also worked as a teaching assistant from 1980-1983 and as a research assistant on various projects in 1980, 1983, 1985-87.

== Career ==
=== Early career ===
Rutström began her career teaching introductory and intermediate economics at the Stockholm School of Economics from 1980-1983. She followed that by working as an instructor at the University of Western Ontario for one year in 1984. Subsequently, between 1998 and 1990 she lectured at the University of New Mexico. She then served as an associate professor at the University of South Carolina from 1991-2004. During this time she served as a consultant to the Office of Naval Research for experiments related to choice attributes, and to the World Bank on the topic of Trade Liberalization in Tunisia, Morocco, and Algeria. In 2004, she became a full-time professor in the economics department at the University of Central Florida. She spent the next six years as a professor at Georgia State University, concluding in 2016. Throughout her career she has taught a variety of courses ranging from introductory microeconomics, to game theory, to MBA managerial economics.

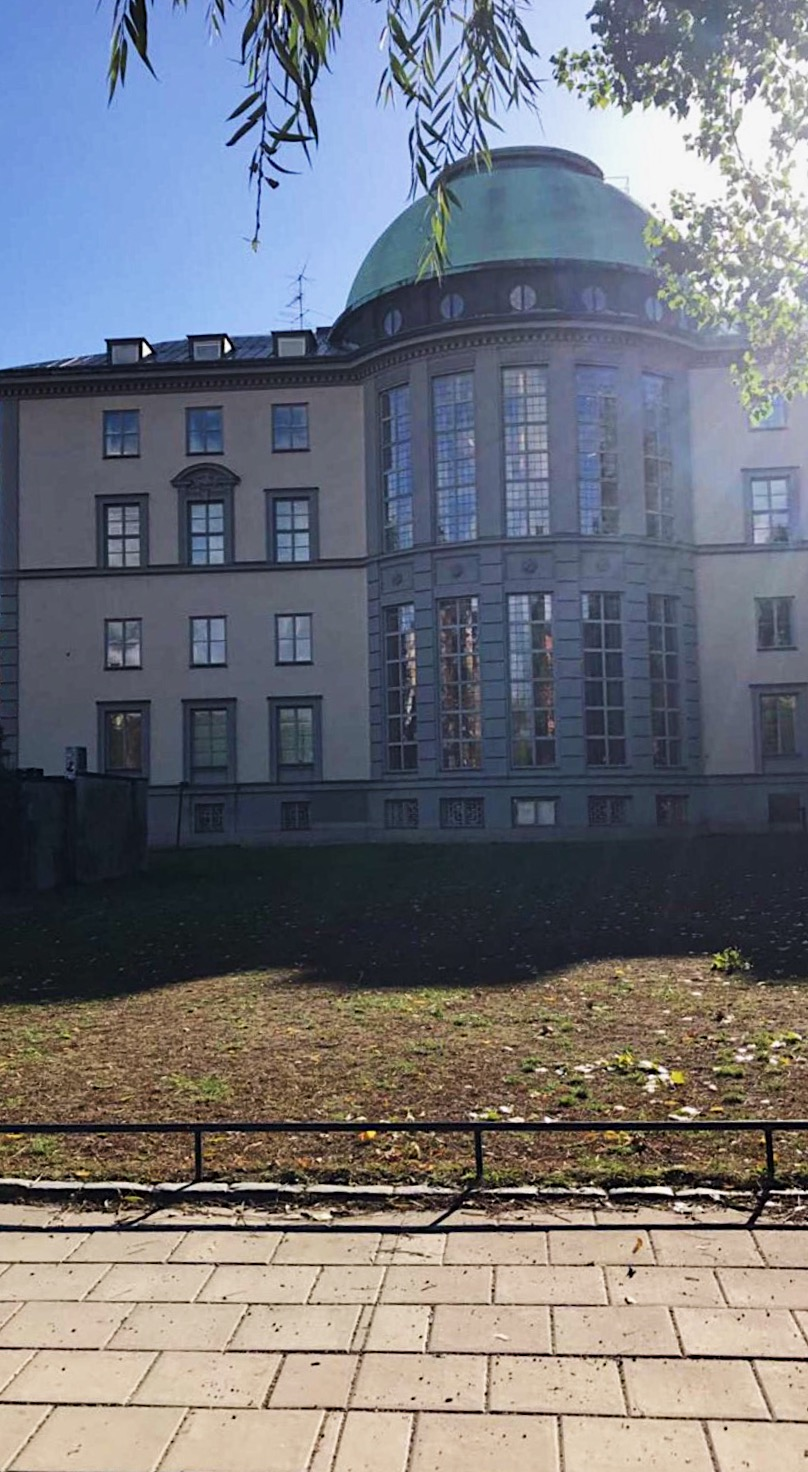
The Stockholm School of Economics, where Rutström studied, instructed, and currently serves as an affiliated professor.

=== Current career ===
At this time, Rutström primarily acts as researcher for her independent company Rutström Research Analytics.

Beginning in 2016, Rutström has served as the program director at Georgia State University's Center for Analysis of Economic Risk (CEAR). While there, she was involved in a team that successfully advocated for proper sample representations in Denmark.

Rutström is also an honorary professor at the University of Cape Town, a guest professor at Örebro University, and an affiliated professor at her alma mater, the Stockholm School of Economics.

== Research ==
Rutström has accomplished notable research in both lab and field experiments. Her most popular research focuses on risk aversion, attitude, and preferences.

She has had more than 45 scholarly journals published, as well as publications in numerous books and monographs. Overall, her work has been cited in 9566 articles and working papers.

Rutström has received the Experimental Economics Editor's Award for best paper published in volumes 11 and 12, and the European Economic Review Award for best paper published (2014).

At Georgia State, Rutström is currently working on a paper with Arianna Galliera that focuses on risk management decisions made by families living in Atlanta. Titled “Nothing Left to Lose”: Risk Attitudes Among Vulnerable Households, the study examines how families with limited financial resources manage risks associated with finance and health. A complete list of her current research includes Experimental Economics Decision Making Under Risk and Uncertainty, Risk Portfolios of Poor Households, Responses to Congestion Pricing, Formal Ante-natal Care Acceptability in Pakistan, and Inflation Perceptions.

=== Selected publications ===
- Andersen, Steffen, Glenn W. Harrison, Morten I. Lau, and E. Elisabet Rutström, “Elicitation Using Multiple Price List Formats,” Experimental Economics, 9(4), 2006, 383-405.
- Andersen, Steffen, Glenn W. Harrison, Morten I. Lau, and E. Elisabet Rutström, “Eliciting Risk and Time Preferences,” Econometrica, (76) 3, May 2008, 583-618.
- Cummings, Ronald G., Glenn W. Harrison, and E. Elisabet Rutström, “Homegrown Values and Hypothetical Surveys: Is the Dichotomous Choice Approach Incentive Compatible?”, American Economic Review, 85 (1), March 1995, 260-266.
- Harrison, Glenn W., and E. Elisabet Rutström, “Risk Aversion in the Laboratory,” in J.C. Cox and G. W. Harrison (eds.), Risk Aversion in Experiments (Bingley, UK: Emerald, Research in Experimental Economics, Volume 12, 2008).
- Harrison, Glenn W., Morten I. Lau, and E. Elisabet Rutström, “Estimating Risk Attitudes in Denmark,” Scandinavian Journal of Economics, 109(2), June 2007, 341-368.

==== "Eliciting Using Multiple Price List Formats" ====
Rutström helped conduct an analysis of the multiple price list format to determine if it served as an appropriate method for eliciting individual choice and risk preference. The multiple price list format is a simple procedure where participants are asked to respond yes or no to a variety of prices for a commodity, and while doing so, reveal their willingness to pay. Traditionally, the multiple price list format has had three potential flaws, interval responses, the ability to switch answers between prices, and framing effects. After manipulating the traditional price list format, Rutström et al. were able to mitigate the majority of framing effects (tendency to move towards the middle price choice), and reduce a portion of ordering effects. Ordering effects still present were determined to be a result of human error and the possibility of a learning curve as they moved farther down in the responses. Overall, they found that by manipulating small features of the multiple price list format, it could be improved to provide more accurate results on risk preference. This should specifically be designed for each unique population, due to differing results across groups. When eliciting discount rates, it was found that results were more consistent and the same level of format manipulation was not necessary.

==== "Eliciting Risk and Time Preferences" ====
In this 2008 paper, Rutström was part of a group of researchers who conducted experiments in Denmark to jointly bring forth time and risk preferences in participants. Isolating for these preferences in separate experiments, they determined that when examining an individual's utility, discount rates are not linear as previously assumed. When accounting for participants that are risk averse rather than risk neutral, the resulting discount rates were significantly lower. This is in response to the difference in an individual's trade-off between long-run optimization and short-term temptation. They recommend that experiments involving time preference should jointly consider risk preference for a more appropriate discount rate.

==== "Is the Dichotomous Choice Approach Incentive Compatible?" ====
In this paper, Rutström et al. examine if using the dichotomous choice method with incentive compatible questions, results in an accurate willingness to pay. The assumption behind the theory is that individuals will answer a hypothetical question with the same response that they would to an identical question with real economic consequences. Using their own set of incentive compatible questions, results showed that the real and hypothetical answers were significantly different and they could not confirm that this theory on dichotomous choice compatibility could reasonably be confirmed. These results held true for different question formats and across all tested demographics, including non-students.

==== "Risk Aversion in the Laboratory" ====
In collaboration with Glenn W. Harrison, Rutström examines the popular assumption that participants are risk neutral in experiments, and the implications of altering this assumption. Experiments were conducted to estimate the different risk attitudes of individuals in such a way that it isolated risk preference in the laboratory from other factors. The majority of participants are discovered to behave as risk averse, a few as risk neutral, and almost none as risk preferring. Levels of aversion were determined to correlated with observable characteristics of the participants. Because risk preference is present in many economic experiments, Harrison and Rutström argue that proper measurement and application of these attitudes should be conducted in all applicable cases. Although different methods may provide slightly different results, they do believe that there are reliable methods that can provide worthwhile information on risk aversion.

==== "Estimating Risk Attitudes in Denmark" ====
Alongside three other researchers, Rutström conducted a field experiment to analyze how groups of different socio-demographic characteristics differ in their attitudes toward risk. Using a carefully selected sample from a six-step procedure, they analyzed 253 individuals aged 19–75, representing the Danish population. Based on their findings, they concluded that as a whole, Danish people should be characterized as risk averse, rather than risk neutral. Certain socio-demographic groups also displayed different levels of risk preference. In particular, individuals over the age of 40, and those of increased education levels, displayed higher risk aversion.

== Academic and community involvement ==
Over her teaching career, Rutström has acted as PhD dissertation supervisor for more than 20 years, including the supervision of ten master and honors thesis'. Between 2005-2009, she also served as associated editor for the European Economic Review journal.

Twice, Rutström has served on the board of major organizations throughout her career. During her time at the University of South Carolina, she was a board member and president for the American Civil Liberties Union (ACLU) of South Carolina, in 1999 and from 2000-2002 respectively. Additionally, she served as a board member for the Heifetz International Music Institute (2003-2008), a non-profit organization that helps support the careers of young, talented musicians.
