= Adrian Walsh =

Australian philosopher

- Born: 1963 (age 62–63)
- Awards: research fellowships at the University of St Andrews and the University of Helsinki

Education
- Education: University of Melbourne (PhD), Flinders University (BA)

Philosophical work
- Era: 21st-century philosophy
- Region: Western philosophy
- School: Analytic
- Institutions: University of New England (Australia)
- Main interests: political philosophy, applied ethics, philosophy of economics
- Website: https://www.une.edu.au/staff-profiles/hass/awalsh

Adrian J. Walsh (born 1963) is an Australian philosopher and professor of philosophy at the University of New England (Australia). He is known for his expertise on political philosophy, philosophy of economics and applied ethics. Walsh is an associate editor of the Journal of Applied Philosophy.

== Books ==
- The Morality of Money: An Exploration in Analytic Philosophy
- A Neo-Aristotelian Theory of Social Justice
- Usury: The Moral Foundations of Lending at Interest
- Ethics, Money and Sport: This Sporting Mammon

=== Edited books ===
- The Ethical Underpinnings of Climate Economics
- Scientific Imperialism: Exploring the Boundaries of Interdisciplinarity

== See also ==
- Scientific imperialism
- Business ethics
- Economics of global warming
- Philosophy of sport
