= Economic and Environmental Geology =

Scholarly journal focused on geology

- Discipline: Geology
- Language: Korean
- Edited by: Minhee Lee

Publication details
- History: 1968–present
- Publisher: The Korean Society of Economic and Environmental Geology (South Korea)
- Open access: Yes
- License: Creative Commons Attribution Non-Commercial License 3.0

Standard abbreviations
- ISO 4: Econ. Environ. Geol.

Indexing
- ISSN: 1225-7281 (print); 2288-7962 (web)
- OCLC no.: 1127407604

Links
- Journal homepage

Economic and Environmental Geology is a peer-reviewed open access scholarly journal publishing original research and reviews in the fields of ore deposits, economic and environmental geology of the solid Earth at all scales. It the official journal of the Korean Society of Economic and Environmental Geology. The current editor-in-chief is Minhee Lee.

== Abstracting and indexing ==
The journal is abstracted and indexed in:

- Emerging Sources Citation Index
- Scopus
