= International Journal of Ecology & Development =

The International Journal of Ecology & Development is a scientific journal published by the Indian Society for Development and Research that was established to cover "research and developments in ecology and development." The editor-in-chief is Kaushal K. Srivastava. It has been published since 2005 and is included in Scopus.
