= Energy Information Administration =

US Department of Energy agency

U.S. Energy Information Administration

Agency overview
- Formed: October 1, 1977
- Jurisdiction: Federal government of the United States
- Headquarters: Washington, D.C., U.S.
- Annual budget: $126.8 million (FY2021)
- Agency executives: Tristan Abbey, Administrator; Angelina LaRose, Deputy Administrator
- Parent agency: United States Department of Energy
- Website: EIA.gov

The Energy Information Administration (EIA) is a principal agency of the United States federal statistical system responsible for collecting, analyzing, and disseminating energy information to promote sound policymaking, efficient markets, and public understanding of energy and its interaction with the economy and the environment. EIA programs cover data on coal, petroleum, natural gas, electric, renewable and nuclear energy. EIA is part of the U.S. Department of Energy.

== Background ==
The Department of Energy Organization Act of 1977 established EIA as the primary federal government authority on energy statistics and analysis, building upon systems and organizations first established in 1974 following the oil market disruption of 1973.

EIA conducts a comprehensive data collection program that covers the full spectrum of energy sources, end uses, and energy flows; generates short- and long-term domestic and international energy projections; and performs informative energy analyses.

EIA disseminates its data products, analyses, reports, and services to customers and stakeholders primarily through its website and the customer contact center.

Located in Washington, D.C., EIA has about 325 federal employees and a budget of $126.8 million in fiscal year 2021.

== List of administrators ==
Portrait	Administrator	Took office	Left office
	Lincoln Moses	1978	1980
	Erich Evered	1981	1984
	Helmut Merklein	1985	1990
	Calvin Kent	1990	1993
	Jay Hakes	1993	2000
	Guy Caruso	2002	2008
	Richard G. Newell	August 3, 2009	July 1, 2011
	Adam Sieminski	June 4, 2012	January 20, 2017
	Linda Capuano	January 9, 2018	January 20, 2021
	Joseph DeCarolis	April 11, 2022	January 20, 2025
	Stephen Nalley (acting)	January 20, 2025	September 25, 2025
	Tristan Abbey	September 25, 2025	Incumbent

== Independence ==
By law, EIA's products are prepared independently of policy considerations. EIA neither formulates nor advocates any policy conclusions. The Department of Energy Organization Act allows EIA's processes and products to be independent from review by Executive Branch officials; specifically, Section 205(d) says:

"The Administrator shall not be required to obtain the approval of any other officer or employee of the Department in connection with the collection or analysis of any information; nor shall the Administrator be required, prior to publication, to obtain the approval of any other officer or employee of the United States with respect to the substance of any statistical or forecasting technical reports which he has prepared in accordance with law."

== Products ==
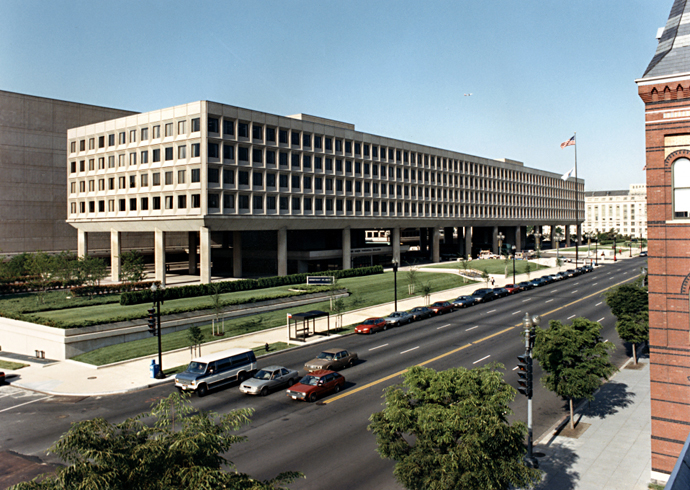
Offices in the James V. Forrestal Building

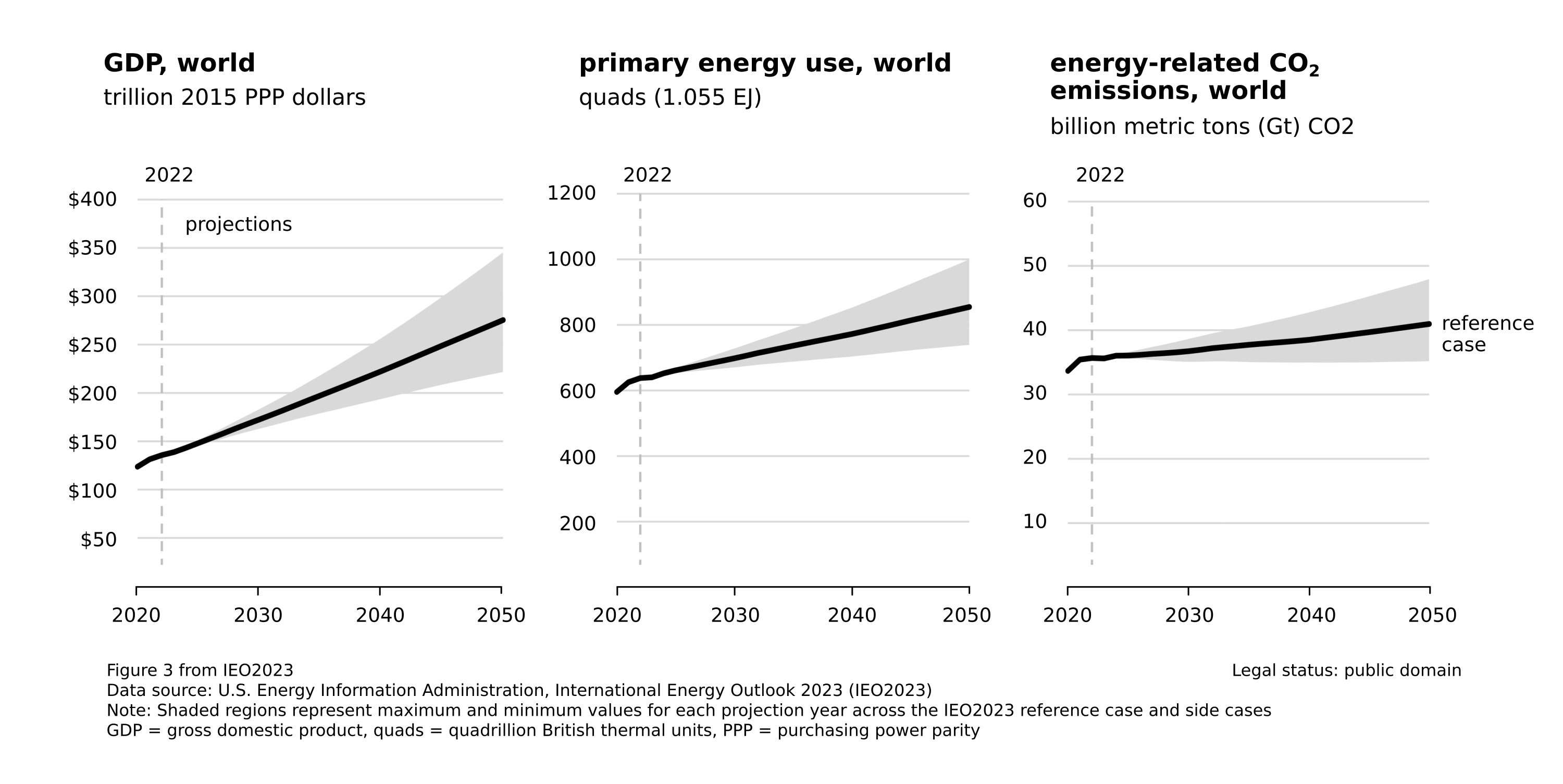
Figure 3 from the International Energy Outlook 2023 (IEO2023) report. Aggregate energy‑related carbon emissions remain constant to 2050 under the low GDP growth case, otherwise they rise significantly. The analysis is based on current ascertainable policy interventions.

More than two million people use the EIA's information online each month. Some of the EIA's products include:

- General Interest Energy Information
  - Energy Explained: Energy information written for a general, non-technical audience. A nonpartisan guide to the entire range of energy topics from biodiesel to uranium.
  - Energy Kids: Educates students, citizens, and even policymakers and journalists about energy.
  - Energy Glossary: Common energy terms defined in plain language.
- Timely Analysis
  - Today in Energy: Informative content published every weekday that includes a graph or map and a short, timely story written in plain language that highlights current energy issues, topics, and data trends.
  - This Week in Petroleum: Weekly summary and explanation of events in United States and world petroleum markets, including weekly data. This report, together with its companion, the Weekly Petroleum Status Report, is a handy tool for investors. These are published every Wednesday (unless Monday is a holiday) at 10:30 AM Eastern Time (for the preliminary version) with the full report following at 1 PM Eastern. The Weekly Petroleum Status Report provides estimates of the amount of crude oil and petroleum products in storage, so that one may get a sense of whether stocks are building or declining, and of US oil production, so that an interested party can get a sense of whether it is decreasing or increasing. It is not unusual for the price of crude oil to jump up or down by a few percentage points, immediately after this report is released.
  - Natural Gas Weekly Update: Weekly summary and discussion of events and trends in U.S. natural gas markets.
- Data and Surveys
  - Gasoline and Diesel Fuel Update: Weekly price data for U.S. national and regional averages.
  - Monthly Energy Review: Provides statistics on monthly and annual U.S. energy consumption going back in some cases to 1949. The figures are given in units of quads (quadrillion BTUs.)
  - Annual Energy Review: EIA's primary report of historical annual energy statistics. For many series, data begin with the year 1949. This report has been superseded by the Monthly Energy Review and was not produced for 2012.
  - Country Energy Profiles: Data by country, region, and commercial group (OECD, OPEC) for 219 countries with additional country analysis notes for 87 of these.
  - Country Analysis Briefs: EIA's in-depth analyses of energy production, consumption, imports, and exports for 36 individual countries and regions.
  - Residential Energy Consumption Survey: EIA's comprehensive survey and analysis of residential energy consumption, household characteristics, and appliance saturation.
  - Commercial Buildings Energy Consumption Survey: A national sample survey that collects information on the stock of U.S. commercial buildings, including their energy-related building characteristics and energy usage data (consumption and expenditures).
- Projections and Outlooks
  - Short-Term Energy Outlook: Energy projections for the next 13–24 months, updated monthly.
  - Annual Energy Outlook: Projection and analysis of U.S. energy supply, demand, and prices through 2040 based on EIA's National Energy Modeling System. Projections are currently based on existing legislation, without assumption of any future congressional action or technological advancement. In 2015, EIA has been criticized by the Advanced Energy Economy (AEE) Institute after its release of the AEO 2015-report to "consistently underestimate the growth rate of renewable energy, leading to 'misperceptions' about the performance of these resources in the marketplace". AEE points out that the average power purchase agreement (PPA) for wind power was already at $24/MWh in 2013. Likewise, PPA for utility-scale solar PV are seen at current levels of $50–$75/MWh. These figures contrast strongly with EIA's estimated LCOE of $125/MWh (or $114/MWh including subsidies) for solar PV in 2020. This criticism has been repeated every year since.
  - International Energy Outlook: EIA's assessment of the outlook for international energy markets through 2040.

== Legislation ==
The Federal Energy Administration Act of 1974 created the Federal Energy Administration (FEA), the first U.S. agency with the primary focus on energy and mandated it to collect, assemble, evaluate, and analyze energy information. It also provided the FEA with data collection enforcement authority for gathering data from energy producing and major consuming firms. Section 52 of the FEA Act mandated establishment of the National Energy Information System to "… contain such energy information as is necessary to carry out the Administration's statistical and forecasting activities …"

The Department of Energy Organization Act of 1977, Public Law 95-91, created the Department of Energy. Section 205 of this law established the Energy Information Administration (EIA) as the primary federal government authority on energy statistics and analysis to carry out a " ...central, comprehensive, and unified energy data and information program which will collect, evaluate, assemble, analyze, and disseminate data and information which is relevant to energy resource reserves, energy production, demand, and technology, and related economic and statistical information, or which is relevant to the adequacy of energy resources to meet demands in the near and longer term future for the Nation's economic and social needs."

The same law established that EIA's processes and products are independent from review by Executive Branch officials.

The majority of EIA energy data surveys are based on the general mandates set forth above. However, there are some surveys specifically mandated by law, including:

- EIA-28, Financial Reporting System - Section 205(h) of the DOE Organization Act.
- EIA-1605 and 1605EZ, Voluntary Reporting of Greenhouse Gases - Section 1605(b) of the Energy Policy Act of 1992.
- EIA-886, Annual Survey of Alternative Fueled Vehicle Suppliers and Users - Section 503(b) of the Energy Policy Act of 1992.
- EIA-858, Uranium Marketing Annual Survey - Section 1015 of the Energy Policy Act of 1992.
- EIA-846A-C, Manufacturing Energy Consumption Survey - Section 205(i) of the DOE Organization Act (the act calls for a biennial survey; however, this survey is done quadrennially due to resource constraints).
- EIA-457A-G, Residential Energy Consumption Survey - Section 205(k) of the DOE Organization Act (the act calls for a triennial survey; however, this survey is done quadrennially due to resource constraints).
- EIA-871A-F, Commercial Buildings Energy Consumption Survey - Section 205(k) of the DOE Organization Act (the act calls for a triennial survey; however, this survey is done quadrennially due to resource constraints).
- Petroleum Marketing Surveys - Section 507 of Part A of Title V of the Energy Policy and Conservation Act of 1975 broadly directs EIA to collect information on the pricing, supply, and distribution of petroleum products by product category at the wholesale and retail levels, on a State-by-State basis, which was collected as of September 1, 1981, by the Energy Information Administration.

== See also ==
- Canadian Centre for Energy Information
- United States energy law
