= Resources for the Future =

U.S. non-profit organization

Coordinates: 38°54′34″N 77°2′15″W

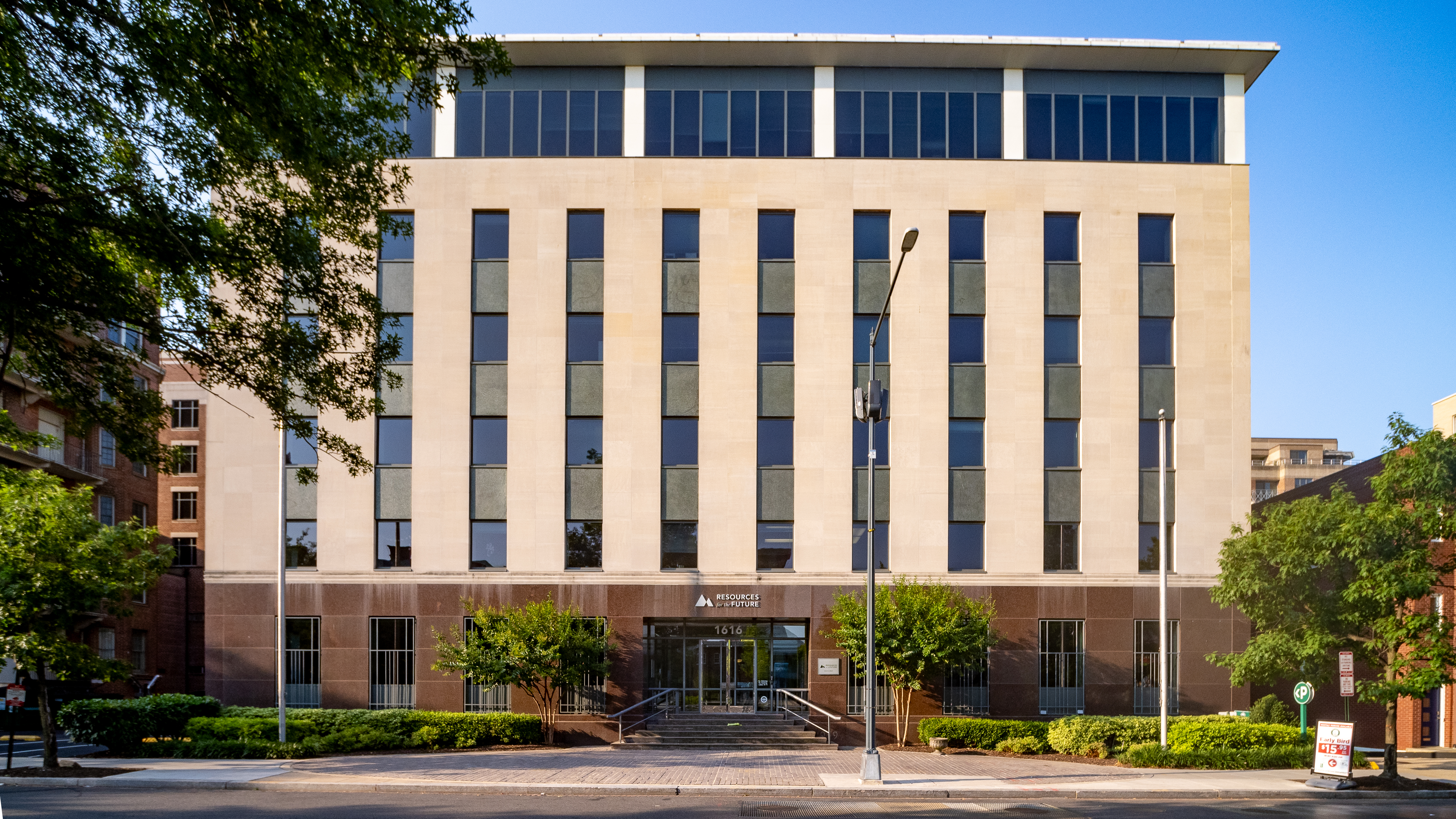
- Resources for the Future, near Dupont Circle in Washington, D.C.
- Abbreviation: RFF
- Formation: 1952; 74 years ago
- Type: environmental and natural resource policy think tank
- Headquarters: 1616 P Street NW
- Location: Washington, D.C., U.S.
- President: William Pizer
- Revenue: $14,625,239 (2014)
- Expenses: $13,610,452 (2014)
- Website: RFF.org

Resources for the Future (RFF) is an American nonprofit organization, founded in 1952, that conducts independent research into environmental, energy, and natural resource issues, primarily via economics and other social sciences. Headquartered in Washington, D.C., RFF performs research around the world.

== Overview and history ==
In 1951, U.S. President Harry S. Truman asked William S. Paley, the chairman of the board of Columbia Broadcasting System (CBS), to form a Materials Policy Commission to study the country's natural resource needs. The report, Resources for Freedom: Foundations for Growth and Security, recommended the formation of an independent organization to analyze the supply of the country's natural resources.

Founded in 1952 with initial grants from the Ford Foundation, RFF focused in its early years on natural resource scarcity and import dependence, helping to pioneer the field of resource economics. It became the first "think tank" devoted exclusively to natural resource and environmental issues.

As of 2011, RFF's staff encompasses some 75 researchers and staff. Most researchers hold doctorates in economics, but many also hold advanced degrees in engineering, law, ecology, city and regional planning, U.S. government, and public policy and management, among other fields.

In addition, specialized centers, programs, and initiatives at RFF focus on specific areas of research and operate collaboratively across disciplines. These include the Center for Climate and Electricity Policy; the Center for the Management of Ecological Wealth; the Center for Energy Economics and Policy; the Center for Forest Economics and Policy; and the Environment for Development. RFF also established and is closely affiliated with the Center for Disease Dynamics, Economics, and Policy, which is now an independent unit.

Although RFF scholars are free to express professional opinions in their research, the organization itself does not take institutional positions on legislation or regulatory policy. RFF characterizes itself as nonpartisan, objective, and independent, "acting as a neutral broker of sound information and data" but does not list criteria for information and data to be found "sound".

RFF publishes a magazine, as well as discussion papers, issue briefs, and peer-reviewed reports.

In June 2010, RFF was awarded the FEEM 20th Anniversary Prize in Environmental Economics by the European-based Fondazione Eni Enrico Mattei. The award recognized RFF as a "key driver of market-based environmental policy".

== Funding ==
RFF is a 501(c)(3) tax-exempt organization. In fiscal year 2010, RFF's operating revenue was $11.04 million, most of which came from individual and corporate contributions, foundation and government grants, and investment income. The United States Environmental Protection Agency, the George Kaiser Family Foundation, the Robert Wood Johnson Foundation, the David and Lucile Packard Foundation, and the Bill & Melinda Gates Foundation comprised RFF's top five donors in 2009. The organization's research programs make up the bulk of its expenses, amounting to 76.8 percent in 2010 and 79 percent in 2021.

== Notable RFF research ==
Several influential scholars from RFF's early years helped shape environmental policies worldwide.

- John V. Krutilla was a central figure at RFF from 1955 to 1988. In his 1967 paper "Conservation Reconsidered," Krutilla described the economic value of undisturbed natural environments like rivers and forests. Published in the American Economic Review, the paper became "a benchmark in the economics of conservation" and provided a basis for including preservation benefits in policy analysis.
- Allen V. Kneese joined RFF in 1961, and his work on water quality management led him to argue that market-based incentives like pollution taxes, which left it up to each polluter to find the cheapest and easiest way to comply, were more efficient than conventional regulation at reducing pollution and costs to the economy, and avoided distortions in international trade. Revolutionary in the 1960s, Kneese's ideas laid the groundwork for the sulfur dioxide emissions-trading program established by Congress in 1990 to curb acid rain. He left in Resources for the Future in 1974.
- Hans Landsberg began his work at RFF in 1960, specializing in energy and mineral economics. His contributions included lead-authorship of Resources in America's Future (1963), a thousand-page volume examining the role of natural resources in the U.S. economy and projecting their long-term availability. Both this and another 1963 RFF publication, Scarcity and Growth, set out the idea that growth was a bigger problem than natural resource shortages.
- Marion Clawson, a long-time RFF scholar and a former acting president of the institution, was a pioneer in the field of resource economics who had a major influence on government policies over public lands and forest management. His 1975 book Forests for Whom and for What? examined ways to balance timber production, recreation, and ecology in the use of federal forest land. He was an early advocate of sustainability in management of natural environments and preservation of wilderness areas

RFF also conducted pathbreaking research on the allocation of the electromagnetic spectrum. Harvey J. Levin's book The Invisible Resource: Use and Regulation of the Radio Spectrum (1971), advocated a market-based approach. Twenty years later, the Federal Communications Commission began licensing and auctioning these airwaves accordingly.

== Leadership ==
William Pizer was named president and CEO in 2024.

Richard Newell joined RFF as president on September 1, 2016. He was previously the Gendell Professor of Energy and Environmental Economics at Duke University and Founding Director of its Energy Initiative and Energy Data Analytics Lab. From 2009 to 2011, he served as the administrator of the US Energy Information Administration, the agency responsible for official US government energy statistics and analysis. He also served as the senior economist for energy and environment on the President's Council of Economic Advisers and was a senior fellow, and later a board member, at RFF.

Philip R. Sharp served as president from 2005 to 2016. Before joining RFF, Sharp served 10 terms as a member of the United States House of Representatives from Indiana (1975 to 1995). He then joined the faculty of the John F. Kennedy School of Government and the Institute of Politics at Harvard University. As of 2010, Sharp is co-chair of the Energy Board of the Keystone Center and serves on the board of directors of the Duke Energy Corporation and the Energy Foundation. He is also a member of the Cummins Science and Technology Advisory Council and serves on the advisory board of the Institute of Nuclear Power Operations and on the external advisory board of the Massachusetts Institute of Technology Energy Initiative. He is a member of the Blue Ribbon Commission on America's Nuclear Future and the U.S. Partnership for Renewable Energy Finance. He was an inaugural inductee into the Energy Efficiency Forum Hall of Fame in 2009.

Paul R. Portney served as president of RFF from 1995 to 2005. Portney joined the research staff of RFF in 1972. From 1986 to 1989 he headed two of its research divisions, and in 1989 he became its vice president. In June 2005, Portney became dean of the Eller College of Management at the University of Arizona. One journalist assessed Portney's tenure at RFF by saying that "he never shied away from using the facts to challenge business interests that reflexively opposed all regulation, or environmental groups that never met one they didn't like".

== Recent and current projects ==
In July 2011, RFF's Center for Energy Economics and Policy (CEEP) launched an initiative to identify the priority risks associated with the hydraulic fracturing of shale formations and recommend strategies for responsible development. This analysis, made possible by a $1.2 million grant from the Alfred P. Sloan Foundation, will be the first independent, broad assessment of the key risks associated with the shale gas development process.

The CEEP research team, led by RFF Research Director and Senior Fellow Alan Krupnick, will survey expert opinion and public perception to determine the most significant risks and the behaviors of industry and regulators that influence those risks. Pairing these findings to an analysis of existing state and federal policies will lead to recommendations for how to improve the management of shale gas development.

In August 2010, the National Commission on the BP Deepwater Horizon Oil Spill and Offshore Drilling asked CEEP to conduct a series of studies that would help inform the commission's report and recommendations. Nearly a dozen RFF experts in risk assessment, regulatory and benefit–cost analysis, government enforcement, and the oil industry formulated a series of findings and recommendations to improve the safety of future oil-drilling operations.

In response to questions on a clean energy standard (CES) posed by leadership of the Senate Committee on Energy and Natural Resources in April 2011, experts from RFF submitted key findings from their research and modeling.

Several RFF researchers contributed to the work of the Intergovernmental Panel on Climate Change (IPCC), the co-recipient of the 2007 Nobel Peace Prize. Among current and former RFF researchers who have participated in the nearly two decades since the IPCC was founded are Senior Fellows Alan Krupnick, Roger Sedjo, William Pizer, and Richard Morgenstern.

In 2009, an RFF study The State of the Great Outdoors: America's Parks, Public Lands, and Recreation Resources, authored by Margaret Walls, Sarah Darley, and Juha Siikamäki, examined the condition of America's outdoor resources, the demand for recreation, and the financing of conservation, parks, and open space. It was carried out in conjunction with the Outdoor Resources Review Group, a bipartisan assemblage of public officials, conservation specialists, and recreation professionals.

In 2010, RFF and the National Energy Policy Institute released a comprehensive economic analysis of more than 35 available policy options for reducing U.S. oil consumption and curbing carbon dioxide emissions through 2030. Combining a standardized modeling approach and the judgments of top academic experts from around the country, Toward a New National Energy Policy: Assessing the Options provides a rigorous "apples-to apples" comparison of how different policies rank in terms of such quantitative measures as costs and ability to reduce CO_{2} emissions and barrels of oil consumed.

In 2018, RFF and the Euro-Mediterranean center on climate change established the RFF-CMCC European Institute on Economics and the Environment (EIEE), based in Milan (Italy). The institute's research aims to facilitate the transition to a sustainable and inclusive society.

In 2022, Richard G. Newell (then the president of RFF) and other scientists published a study in Nature that recalculates the social cost of carbon (SCC). The SCC is a key metric used by the US government to calculate costs and benefits of government policies. The SCC metric was introduced under the Obama administration, and has not been updated, due in part to litigation from states that argue that the creation and use of such a metric goes beyond the powers of the federal government. The researchers implemented recommendations from a 2017 report published by the National Academy of Sciences, to address flaws in the initial methodology and make the SCC calculation of the costs of greenhouse gas emissions as accurate as possible. The recalculated results for the social cost of carbon are more than three times higher than the $51 figure which is based on the original methodology, and is used by the US government as of 2022.
