= Review of Environmental Economics and Policy =

- Discipline: Economics
- Language: English

Publication details
- History: 2007 - present
- Publisher: Oxford Journals (UK)
- Frequency: Biannual

Standard abbreviations
- ISO 4: Rev. Environ. Econ. Policy

Indexing
- ISSN: 1750-6816 (print); 1750-6824 (web)
- OCLC no.: 972065233

Links
- Journal homepage

The Review of Environmental Economics and Policy (REEP) is a peer-reviewed journal of environmental economics published twice each year. It is the official "accessible" journal of the Association of Environmental and Resource Economists (AERE), and complements the organization's other journal, the Journal of the Association of Environmental and Resource Economists (JAERE), which has a more technical research orientation.

REEP was conceived after years of consideration by the Association. Just as the Journal of Economic Perspectives is to the American Economic Review, REEP is intended to fill the gap between traditional academic research journals in environmental economics (like JEEM) and the general interest press by providing a widely accessible yet scholarly source for the latest thinking on environmental economics and related policy. REEP publishes symposia, articles, and regular features that contribute to one or more of the following goals: to identify and synthesize lessons learned from recent and ongoing environmental economics research, to provide economic analysis of environmental policy issues, to promote the sharing of ideas and perspectives among the various sub-fields of environmental economics, to strengthen the linkages between environmental economics research and environmental policy, to encourage communication and connections between academics and the wider policy community, to offer suggestions for future research, to provide insights and readings for use in the classroom, and to address issues of interest to the environmental economics profession.

REEP is edited by Spencer Banzhaf at the North Carolina State University. Articles published by the REEP are generally commissioned by the editors, but are still typically subjected to anonymous peer review. Given the requirement that material appearing in the journal should be written for a non-technical audience and be highly readable, the submission of unsolicited manuscripts is not encouraged. There are simply too few other outlets for a paper with this structure if it turns out not to be appropriate for REEP. Speculative preparation of an article thus represents more of a gamble that usual in the world of economics journals. Instead, the editors welcome proposals for topics and authors, so that the suitability of potential contributions can be considered carefully in advance. All such proposals are invited to be sent to the journal's editorial office. AERE and the editors of REEP hope that this new journal will evolve to continually reflect the interests and the changing needs of the worldwide membership of the AERE, as well as REEP's broader constituency of interested but non-specialist readers.

REEP is indexed by EconLit and the Journal of Economic Literature.
