= Land Economics =

- Discipline: Economics
- Language: English

Publication details
- Former names: The Journal of Land & Public Utility Economics
- History: 1925-present
- Publisher: University of Wisconsin Press (United States)
- Frequency: Quarterly

Standard abbreviations
- ISO 4: Land Econ.

Indexing
- ISSN: 0023-7639 (print); 1543-8325 (web)
- LCCN: 2003212981
- JSTOR: 00237639
- OCLC no.: 47993888

Links
- Journal homepage; Online access

Land Economics is a peer-reviewed academic journal dedicated to the economics of natural and environmental resources. The journal was established in 1925 by the founder of the American Economic Association, Richard T. Ely (University of Wisconsin). Land Economics covers such topics as environmental quality, natural resources, housing, urban and rural land use, transportation, and other areas in both developed and developing country contexts. The journal features conceptual and/or empirical work with direct relevance for public policy. The journal is published by the University of Wisconsin Press. As of 2019, Land Economics had an impact factor of 1.620.

Since 2018, the editor of Land Economics has been Daniel J. Phaneuf, the Henry C. Taylor Professor of Agricultural and Applied Economics at the University of Wisconsin–Madison. Phaneuf follows former editor Daniel W. Bromley, the Anderson-Bascom Professor (Emeritus) of Applied Economics at the University of Wisconsin–Madison, who led the journal for 44 years.
