= Journal of Environmental Economics and Management =

- Discipline: Economics
- Language: English
- Edited by: Roger von Haefen, Andreas Lange

Publication details
- History: 1974–present
- Publisher: Elsevier
- Frequency: Bimonthly
- Impact factor: 4.624 (2020)

Standard abbreviations
- ISO 4: J. Environ. Econ. Manag.

Indexing
- CODEN: JEEMDI
- ISSN: 0095-0696
- LCCN: 74647870
- OCLC no.: 01796173

Links
- Journal homepage; Online access

The Journal of Environmental Economics and Management is a peer-reviewed academic journal of environmental economics published six times per year. It was the official journal of the Association of Environmental and Resource Economists until 2014. The journal is generally regarded as the top journal in natural resources and environmental economics, and publishes theoretical and empirical papers concerned with the linkage between economic systems and environmental and natural resources. Ralph d'Arge and Allen V. Kneese were the founding editors. The current editors-in-chief are Roger von Haefen (North Carolina State University) and Andreas Lange (University of Hamburg). Previous editors include Till Requate, Daniel J. Phaneuf, Joseph Herriges, and Charles F. Mason.

== Most-cited papers ==
According to the Web of Science, the following papers have been cited most often:

- Valuing public-goods - the purchase of moral satisfaction, Kahneman D, Knetsch JL, Vol. 22(1) 57–70, 1992
- Hedonic housing prices and demand for clean-air, Harrison D, Rubinfeld DL, Vol. 5(1) 81–102, 1978
- Environmental-quality and development - is there a kuznets curve for air-pollution emissions, Selden TM, Song DQ, Vol. 27(2) 147–162, 1994
- A new paradigm for valuing non-market goods using referendum data - maximum-likelihood estimation by censored logistic-regression, Cameron TA, Vol. 15(3) 355–379, 1988
- Combining revealed and stated preference methods for valuing environmental amenities, Adamowicz W, Louviere J, Williams M, Vol. 26(3) 271–292, 1994

== See also ==
- Environmental resources management
- Environmental tariff
- Association of Environmental and Resource Economists
