= Environmental and Resource Economics =

- Discipline: Economics
- Language: English
- Edited by: Ian J. Bateman, Ana Espinola-Arredondo, Alistair Munro

Publication details
- History: 1991-present
- Publisher: Springer (Netherlands)
- Frequency: Monthly
- Impact factor: 3.4 (2024)

Standard abbreviations
- ISO 4: Environ. Resour. Econ.

Indexing
- ISSN: 0924-6460

Links
- Journal homepage

Environmental and Resource Economics (ERE) is a peer-reviewed academic journal covering environmental economics published monthly. It is the official journal of the European Association of Environmental and Resource Economists. Since 1991, it has had a growing influence upon the field of environmental economics.

== Related links ==
- European Association of Environmental and Resource Economists (EAERE)
