= Association of Environmental and Resource Economists =

- Founded: 1979

The Association of Environmental and Resource Economists (AERE) was founded in 1979 in the United States as a means of exchanging ideas, stimulating research, and promoting graduate training in environmental and natural resource economics. The majority of its members are affiliated with universities, government agencies, non-profit research organizations, and consulting firms. Many of AERE's members hold graduate degrees in economics, agricultural economics, or related fields, but there are numerous student members as well. The organization also serves many non-specialist members with environmental policy interests. AERE has over 1,000 members from more than thirty countries. AERE is generally acknowledged as the primary professional organization for Environmental and Natural Resources economists in the USA. The European Association of Environmental and Resource Economists is its European equivalent.

== Journals ==
AERE has two journals: the Journal of the Association for Environmental and Resource Economists (JAERE), and the Review of Environmental Economics and Policy (REEP). JAERE publishes original, full-length research papers that offer substantial new insights for scholars of environmental and resource economics, while REEP focuses on widely accessible review-style articles related to the latest thinking on environmental economics and policy.

== Meetings and Workshops ==
AERE hosts the AERE Summer Conference, which takes place in late May or early June of each year and lasts about three days. The conference includes plenary sessions, AERE’s annual Awards Luncheon, and many parallel research sessions. Recent locations of the AERE Summer conference include Washington, DC (2024), Portland, ME (2023), and Miami, FL (2022). In 2025, the conference will be held in Santa Ana Pueblo, New Mexico, from May 28 to 30.

In addition to the annual conference, AERE co-sponsors the World Congress of Environmental and Resource Economists, which is held every four years. AERE organizes sessions at the annual meetings of other economic organizations (Allied Social Science Associations (ASSA) / American Economic Association, Agricultural and Applied Economics Association, Eastern Economics Association, Midwest Economics Association, Southern Economic Association, and Western Economic Association International).

AERE also hosts several virtual workshops. The AERE Fall Workshop is held online in the early fall of each year. In 2022, AERE began hosting OSWEET sessions online, originally founded as the Online Summer Workshop in Environmental, Energy, and Transportation economics in summer 2020. AERE@OSWEET takes place approximately monthly during the academic year.

== Students and Early Professionals ==
AERE has multiple programs to support graduate students and early professionals.

AERE’s Graduate Student Engagement (GSE) Committee maintains several efforts to include and develop the skills of graduate students in environmental and resource economics. The Graduate Student Engagement Committee organizes the Professional Development Panel Series, which includes quarterly panels where experienced scholars share their wisdom and experiences. These conversations are tailored specifically for graduate students and include topics such as effectively communicating research through writing and talks, effective and efficient teaching, and preparing for the academic job market. In addition to the panels, the GSE Committee also organizes graduate student meetups at conferences.

To help early-career scholars succeed and increase diversity in environmental and resource economics, AERE created the AERE Scholars Program. This program is aimed at early-career scholars no more than five years post PhD. AERE Scholars are matched with mentors who must have a minimum of five years of professional experience. Scholars and Mentors participate in workshops and other development opportunities.

== Awards ==
AERE confers several awards to recognize significant contributions to the field of environmental and resource economics. All awards are announced annually at the AERE Summer Conference. Further information on each award is available on the AERE website.

- The AERE Fellows program is the association’s highest honor. Each year, AERE names up to three individuals as Fellows in recognition of their outstanding contributions to the advancement of environmental and resource economics through research, teaching, or service.
- The Wallace E. Oates Outstanding Doctoral Dissertation Award is presented annually to a recent Ph.D. recipient whose dissertation demonstrates originality, rigorous implementation, and intellectual and practical significance of the research findings.
- The AERE Publication of Enduring Quality (PEQ) Award, given annually since 1989, recognizes a published work of seminal and lasting impact in the field of environmental and resource economics.
- The Ralph C. d’Arge and Allen V. Kneese Award for Outstanding Publication is awarded each year to an exceptional research paper published in the Journal of the Association of Environmental and Resource Economists (JAERE) during the previous calendar year.
- AERE also occasionally confers a Distinguished Service Award to honor individuals who have provided exceptional service to the profession or the association.

== World Congress ==
AERE is a member organization of the World Congress of Environmental and Resource Economists (WCERE), a major international conference held every four years. The WCERE is jointly organized by AERE and its partner organizations: the European Association of Environmental and Resource Economists (EAERE), the East Asian Association of Environmental and Resource Economics (EAAERE), and the Latin American and Caribbean Association of Environmental and Resource Economists (LAERE).
