= GikII =

European tech law conference series

- Abbreviation: None, wordplay on Legal Information Institutes
- Discipline: IT law

Publication details
- History: 2006–present
- Frequency: Annual
- Website: www.gikii.org

GikII is a series of European conferences on the intersections between law, technology and popular culture. It is hosted at a different institution every year. The first conference was in 2006 and was held in Edinburgh, and was organised by Lilian Edwards and Andres Guadamuz.

The conference has been held in several European universities and institutions, including University College London, University of Oxford, University of Edinburgh, University of Amsterdam, Alexander von Humboldt Institute for Internet and Society, University of Vienna and University of Sussex. Spin-off workshops are regularly held in addition to the main yearly conference in other parts of the world or as tracks in other conferences, such as at TILTing 2019 at Tilburg University and SoGikII 2009 at the University of New South Wales.

The conference deals with what the organisers describe as "geek law", studying the intersection of law, regulation, popular culture and technology. The covered topics include artificial intelligence, cryptocurrencies, virtual worlds, games, tattoos, 3D printing, fan fiction, digital privacy, avatar rights, augmented reality, and robots.

== Name ==
The Call for Papers of the first workshop gave the following explanation:

Geeks are the people who contribute to this knowledge: fellow travellers on the digital omnibus, who delight in finding, publishing, inventing and sharing nuggets of joyful knowledge and innovation from the worlds of technology, science, popular culture, and technotrivia. LIIs are Legal Information Institutes: invaluable on-line temples of legal knowledge. The patriarch of the field is AustLII, but the concept has spread through the world bringing us BAILII, PacLII, CommonLII, and no doubt, many more bad puns to come.

GikII proposes to be the place where these worlds, institutions and players will come together for the first time at a major law and technology conference.
