= Computer-assisted legal research =

Computer-assisted legal research (CALR) or computer-based legal research is a mode of legal research that uses databases of court opinions, statutes, court documents, and secondary material. Electronic databases make large bodies of case law easily available. Databases also have additional benefits, such as Boolean searches, evaluating case authority, organizing cases by topic, and providing links to cited material. Databases are available through paid subscription or for free.

Subscription-based services include Westlaw, LexisNexis, JustCite, HeinOnline, Bloomberg Law, Lex Intell, VLex and LexEur. As of 2015, the commercial market grossed $8 billion. Free services include OpenJurist, Google Scholar, AltLaw, Ravel Law, WIPO Lex, Law Delta and the databases of the Free Access to Law Movement.

== Purposes ==
Computer-assisted legal research is undertaken by a variety of actors. It is taught as a topic in many law degrees and is used extensively by undergraduate and postgraduate law students in meeting the work requirements of their degree courses. Professors of Law rely on the digitization of primary and secondary sources of law when conducting their research and writing the material that they submit for publication. Professional lawyers rely on computer-assisted legal research in order to properly understand the status of the law and so to act effectively in the best interest of their client. They may also consult the text of case judgements and statutes specifically, as well as wider academic comment, in order to form the basis of (or response to) an appeal.

The availability of legal information online differs by type, jurisdiction and subject matter. The types of information available include:

1. Texts of statutes, statutory instruments, civil codes, etc.
2. Explanatory notes and government publications relating to statutes and their operation
3. Texts of governing documents such as constitutions and treaties
4. Case judgements
5. Journals on legal matters or legal theory
6. Dictionaries and legal encyclopedia
7. Legal texts and materials in the form of e-books
8. Current affairs and market information
9. Educational information on the law and its operation

== Before the Internet ==
Prior to the advent and popularization of the World Wide Web, access to digital legal information was largely through the use of CD-ROMs, designed and sold by commercial organizations. Dial-up services were also available from the 1970s. As the use of the Internet spread in the early 1990s, companies such as LexisNexis and Westlaw incorporated Internet connectivity into their software packages. Browser-based legal information started to be published by Legal Information Institutes from 1992.

== Publicly available information ==
The first effort to provide free computer access to legal information was made by two academics, Peter Martin and Tom Bruce, in 1992. Today, the Legal Information Institute freely publishes such resources as the text of the United States Constitution, judgements of the United States Supreme Court, and the text of the United States Code.

The Australasian Legal Information Institute (AusLII) was established soon after in 1995. Other legal information institutes, such as those of Great Britain and Ireland (BAILII), Canada (CII) and South Africa (SAfLI) soon followed. LIIs were partially formalized in 2002 following the signing of the Declaration of Free Access to the Law, which has been signed by 54 countries. At the time of writing, the World Legal Information Institute contains in excess of 1800 databases from 123 jurisdictions.

Many governments also publish legal information online. For example, UK legislation and statutory instruments have been publicly available online since 2010. Depending on the jurisdiction in question, the decisions of higher appellate courts may also be published online, either by the Legal Information Institute or by the court service directly. Sources of European Union Law are published for free by EUR-Lex in 23 languages, including judgments of the European Courts. Similarly, judgements of the European Court of Human Rights are published on its website.

== See also ==
- Legal information retrieval
