= Oyez Project =

Online multimedia archive of the Supreme Court of the US

Oyez.org
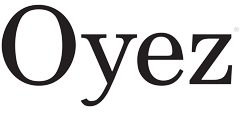
- Website type: Database
- Available in: English
- Owners: Illinois Institute of Technology; Chicago-Kent College of Law; Cornell Law School; Legal Information Institute; Justia
- Creator: Jerry Goldman
- Website: oyez.org
- Commercial: No
- Registration: None
- Current status: active

The Oyez Project is an unofficial online multimedia archive website for the Supreme Court of the United States. It was initiated by the Illinois Institute of Technology's Chicago-Kent College of Law and now also sponsored by Cornell Law School Legal Information Institute and Justia.

The website has emphasis on the court's audio of oral arguments. The website "aims to be a complete and authoritative source for all audio recorded in the Court since [...] October 1955." The website also includes biographical information of both incumbent and historical justices of the Court and advocates who have argued before the court. The project's name refers to the interjection, "Oyez", that is spoken by the Supreme Court Marshal at the beginning of each argument session. The website was founded by Jerry Goldman, a research professor of law at the Chicago-Kent College of Law at Illinois Institute of Technology.

== History ==
The Oyez Project was conceived in Chicago in the late 1980's by Jerry Goldman, a professor of political science, and initially implemented using Apple's HyperCard software. Subsequent support from the National Science Foundation and National Endowment for the Humanities allowed the project to evolve and establish a presence on the internet.

== Government and private support ==
According to the website, the Oyez Project received technological support from National Science Foundation and grants from National Endowment for the Humanities. The project is also supported by various academic institutions such as Weinberg College of Arts and Sciences, the legal web portal FindLaw, and the law firm Mayer Brown, among others.

Jerry Goldman put the Oyez Project up for sale in 2016. He estimated it is "worth well over $1 million", but he hopes the buyer will not put the project behind a paywall. Harvard Law School offered to pay the project's operating costs, but not Goldman's price. In July 2016, the Legal Information Institute at Cornell Law School and Justia joined IIT as sponsors.

== Recognition ==
Oyez.org is listed by the Supreme Court as an authentic, although unofficial, online source to access the court's information.

Oyez.org was featured as "Website of the Week" by international broadcaster Voice of America in January 2006.

The old version of the Oyez database was awarded the Silver Gavel Award for New Media by American Bar Association in 1998. Its founder, Jerry Goldman, was given a medal award in 1997 by EDUCAUSE.

== See also ==
- Oyez
- Supreme Court Historical Society
