= JurisPedia =

Online Encyclopedia

- Screenshot of JurisPedia home page
- Website type: Wiki-based online encyclopedia
- Available in: Multiple
- Creators: African Legal Information Institute, Can Tho University, Université du Québec à Montréal, Institut für Rechtsinformatik, Paul Cézanne University
- Website: jurispedia.org
- Commercial: No
- Registration: Required to edit or create content
- Launched: October 2004
- Current status: Unresponsive
- Content license: Creative Commons Attribution-NonCommercial-ShareAlike license

JurisPedia (/ˈdʒʊərɪsˌpiːdiə/) was a wiki-based online encyclopedia of academic law in many languages, at one time available in Arabic, Chinese, English, French, German, Spanish and Dutch. It was started in October 2004, inspired in part by Wikipedia and the Enciclopedia Libre (University of Seville). JurisPedia ran on the MediaWiki software, but it was not a Wikimedia Foundation project.

JurisPedia was developed on the initiative of the African Legal Information Institute, the Faculty of law of the Can Tho University (Vietnam), the team of JURIS (Université du Québec à Montréal, Canada), the Institut für Rechtsinformatik of Saarland University (Germany), the Institut de Recherche et d'Études en Droit de l'Information et de la Communication (IREDIC) of Paul Cézanne University.

The site, one of the largest legal encyclopedias and online legal references, won the Dieter Meurer Prize for Legal Informatics for 2009.

Since 2012, JurisPedia was member of the Free Access to Law Movement.

On 10 March 2014, the French version of Jurispedia and the Bar Association of Paris have signed an agreement to take part in the creation of the "Great Library of Law".

Jurispedia was last seen online in May 2023.

== See also ==
- Comparative law wiki
- List of online encyclopedias
