= Justia =

American website specializing in legal information retrieval

- Headquarters: Mountain View, California
- Creator: Tim Stanley
- Website: justia.com
- Commercial: Yes
- Launched: 2003; 23 years ago

Justia is an American website specializing in legal information retrieval. It was founded in 2003 by Tim Stanley, formerly of FindLaw, and is one of the largest online databases of legal cases. The company is headquartered in Mountain View, California. The website offers free case law, codes, opinion summaries, and other basic legal texts, with paid services for its attorney directory and webhosting.

In 2007, The New York Times reported that Justia was spending around "$10,000 a month" in order "to copy documents" from the United States Supreme Court and publish them online, to be made available without the public paying fees. Law library research guides often refer to Justia. Duke Law School's law library's research guide notes how it is helpful for PACER.

== See also ==
- Legal Information Institute by Cornell Law School
