= Record sealing =

Legal procedure

Record sealing is the process of making public records inaccessible to the public.

In many cases, a person with a sealed record gains the legal right to deny or not acknowledge anything to do with the arrest and the legal proceedings from the case itself.

Records are commonly sealed in a number of situations:

- Sealed birth records (typically after adoption or determination of paternity)
- Juvenile criminal records may be sealed
- Other types of cases involving juveniles may be sealed, anonymized, or pseudonymized ("impounded"); e.g., child sex offense or custody cases
- Cases using witness protection information may be partly sealed
- Cases involving trade secrets
- Cases involving state secrets

== Filing under seal in US court ==
Normally, records should not be filed under seal without a court permission. However, FRCP 5.2 requires that sensitive text – like Social Security number, Taxpayer Identification Number, birthday, bank accounts, and children’s names – should be redacted off the filings made with the court and accompanying exhibits. A person making a redacted filing can file an unredacted copy under seal, or the Court can choose to order later that an additional filing be made under seal without redaction. Alternately, the filing party may ask the court’s permission to file some exhibits completely under seal.

When the document is filed "under seal", it should have a clear indication for the court clerk to file it separately – most often by stamping words "Filed Under Seal" on the bottom of each page. Person making filing should also provide instructions to the court clerk that the document needs to be filed "under seal". Courts often have specific requirements to these filings in their Local Rules.

== Difference from expungement ==
Expungement, which is a physical destruction, namely a complete erasure of one's criminal records, and therefore usually carries a higher standard, differs from record sealing, which is only to restrict the public's access to records, so that only certain law enforcement agencies or courts, under special circumstances, will have access to them. A record seal will greatly improve the chance of employment, as employers will not have access to damning records. There are occasions, like expungement, where one can truthfully state under oath that they have never been convicted before.

Most of the time, a record seal has more relaxed requirements than an expungement. If an expungement is not allowed with a case, then sealing a record may be the best bet. Different states have different terms for what constitutes sealing of a record.

== Cybersecurity incidents involving sealed records ==
Several cybersecurity incidents have demonstrated that sealed court documents are not always secure in practice, with vulnerabilities and data breaches exposing sensitive information.

In January 2021, following the SolarWinds cyber attack, the U.S. Bankruptcy Court United States District Court for the District of Nevada announced that its Case Management/Electronic Case Files CM/ECF system had been potentially compromised. The judiciary stated that additional safeguards were being implemented to protect filings, and that the review of the incident and its impact was ongoing. Reports noted that the breach raised concerns about exposure of highly sensitive and sealed documents submitted through the CM/ECF system.

In 2023, security researcher Jason Parker, following a tip from an activist, identified flaws in online court systems that exposed sealed records including confidential testimony and medical records through publicly accessible portals.

In 2024, a cyber intrusion targeting attorneys in a civil case involving Representative Matt Gaetz led to the unauthorized access and leak of sealed depositions and related records. The breach exposed confidential testimony and financial records, some of which were later reported by news outlets, raising concerns about the security of electronically stored legal materials and the handling of sealed filings.

In 2025, multiple reports confirmed that the federal judiciary's CM/ECF and PACER (law) filing system was compromised, exposing sealed indictments, confidential informant information, and other sensitive filings. Some courts temporarily reverted to paper-based filing to mitigate the risks of further disclosure. The FBI later confirmed that the breach had exposed sealed records, and investigators suspected foreign state actors were involved.

== GAO publications referencing sealed records ==
- Closed Criminal Plea and Sentencing Proceedings (1983) – Reviewed Department of Justice policies on closing plea and sentencing hearings. GAO noted that sealed transcripts should be unsealed once the reasons for closure no longer applied.
- Information on Plea Agreements and Settlements in Defense Procurement Fraud Cases (1992) – Examined outcomes of procurement fraud prosecutions. GAO observed that in some instances the results were sealed from public access.
- Military Recruiting: More Needs to Be Done to Better Screen Applicants and Detect Fraud (1999) – Investigated fraudulent enlistments in the armed forces. The report highlighted that sealed juvenile records often prevented recruiters from discovering prior offenses.
- Social Security Numbers: Governments Could Do More to Reduce Display in Public Records (2004) – Analyzed risks associated with SSN availability in state and local records. GAO pointed out that some categories of records, such as adoption proceedings, were sealed and less likely to expose identifiers.
- Social Security Numbers: Stronger Safeguards Needed to Protect Privacy (2005 testimony) – Testimony before Congress reiterating concerns over SSN exposure in public records, while noting that sealed categories (e.g., adoption) were exceptions.
- U.S. Supreme Court: Policies and Perspectives on Video and Audio Coverage of Appellate Court Proceedings (2016) – Surveyed appellate court policies on courtroom media coverage. The report acknowledged distinctions between public filings, confidential submissions, and sealed materials.
- Evictions: National Data Are Limited and Challenging to Collect (2024) – Examined nationwide eviction data. GAO reported that in some states eviction records may be sealed or expunged, limiting researchers' ability to compile datasets.
- DOD Fraud Risk Management: Enhanced Data and Collaboration Could Improve Efforts (2024) – Reviewed Department of Defense fraud-risk management. GAO noted that some adjudicative records in its dataset were sealed, restricting completeness of oversight data.

== See also ==
- Sealed birth records
- Expungement
- Matt Gaetz#Legal issues and controversies
