= Comparative law wiki =

A comparative law wiki is a wiki that allows users to create empirical cross-reference datasets for the analysis of the world's myriad legal systems.

== Examples ==
Over the past decade, there have been several attempts to create a global legal wiki, though as of April 2017 none have gained primacy. Examples include JurisPedia; Wex, the online legal encyclopedia created by Cornell Law School's Legal Information Institute, and the World Encyclopedia of Law, by LAWi. Parallel efforts to create crowdsourced data structures to map global legal/regulatory authorities include projects like Intellipedia, an online system for collaborative data sharing used by the United States Intelligence Community (IC).

== Usefulness ==
Comparative law wikis are an efficient method of performing comparative legal analysis. Wikis are particularly useful for comparative global analysis because of the use with which sources from multiple jurisdictions can be gathered in one place. Crowdsourcing permits gathering up-to-date legal authorities from contributors who have local expertise, particularly knowledge of languages and administrative structures that background implementation of particular legal/regulatory norms.

Comparative law wikis can also be useful for comparative study in federal legal systems, such as in the U.S., where 50-state law surveys are particularly useful.

== See also ==
- American Society of Comparative Law
- Black's Law Dictionary
- Wex
