= Southern African Legal Information Institute =

- Founder: University of Witwatersrand with technical support from Australasian Legal Information Institute
- Website: www.saflii.org

The Southern African Legal Information Institute (SAFLII) is the largest online free-access collection of legislation and case law from South Africa and other jurisdictions in the South African region.

SAFLII was formally created in 2002 as a joint project between the Australasian Legal Information Institute (AustLII) and the University of Witwatersrand (Wits) in Johannesburg, South Africa. In 2006 the South African Constitutional Court Trust assumed ownership of the project. The website at the time of this transition carried approximately 700 judgments from South Africa and Namibia.

SAFLII is currently in operation from within the Department of Public Law at the University of Cape Town and has been there from December 2013.

SAFLII became a member of the Free Access to Law Movement at the Law Via the Internet conference in 2003.

Currently, SAFLII serves over 220,000 unique visitors per month and provides access to about 49,000 judgements from South Africa alone. SAFLII also offers access to legislation and open-access journals such as De Jure, the Potchefstroom Electronic Law Journal, SADC Law Journal and Law, Democracy & Development.
