= Tom Bruce =

Tom Bruce may refer to:

- Tom Bruce (cricketer) (born 1991), New Zealand cricketer
- Tom Bruce (rugby league) (1885–1917), Australian rugby league footballer
- Tom Bruce (swimmer) (1952–2020), American swimmer
- Thomas R. Bruce, Legal Information Institute founder
