= Ravel Law =

Startup which offers free access to computer-assisted legal research

Ravel Law is a startup which offers free access to computer-assisted legal research. The firm has funded a major scanning project at the Harvard Law School library known as "Free the Law". The project's goal was to digitize the entire collection of 40 million pages by 2017. The initial announcement at the time stated that access to the library was granted to nonprofit organizations and Ravel Law partners for the first eight years before fully opening to the public. Ravel Law was acquired by RELX as part of the LexisNexis suite of tools in June 2017.

== Business plan ==
In addition to basic free access to the public the firm offers more sophisticated plans to legal firms and researchers.

== See also ==
- Free Access to Law Movement
- RECAP
- vLex
