= Cf. =

Latin abbreviation meaning "compare"

The abbreviation cf. (for Latin confer or conferatur, both meaning 'compare') is generally used in writing to refer the reader to other material to make a comparison with the topic being discussed. Different style guides offer differing advice.

In Italian, the abbreviation "cfr." (confronta, 'confront') is more common than "cf."

== Usage guides ==
Conventions differ between scholarly disciplines:

Style guides such as the one produced by the University of North Carolina at Chapel Hill writing center and The Chicago Manual of Style, recommend that "cf." be used only to suggest a comparison, and "see" or "vide" be used generally to point to a source of information.

A 2010 American Psychological Association (APA) style guide states that "cf." should be "used to provide contrasting or opposing information", while "to compare like things, use 'see' or 'see also'".

Wex, the online legal dictionary created by Cornell Law School, says that "a cf. source simply offers a different yet non-contradictory claim and actual support to the claim just made should not be assumed. If the source gives a contradictory claim, a negative signal should be used." As negative signals, they offer "in order from mutually exclusive to somewhat contradictory: Contra, But see, and But cf."

== Use in biology ==
In taxonomy in biology, cf. is placed between the genus name and the species name to describe a specimen that is hard to identify because of practical difficulties, such as poor preservation. For example, "Barbus cf. holotaenia" indicates that the specimen is in the genus Barbus and believed to be Barbus holotaenia, but the actual species-level identification cannot be certain.

Cf. can also be used to express a possible identity, or at least a significant resemblance, such as between a newly observed specimen and a known species or taxon. Such a usage might suggest a specimen's membership of the same genus or possibly of a shared higher taxon. For example, in the note "Diptera: Tabanidae, cf. Tabanus", the author is confident of the order and family (Diptera: Tabanidae) but can only suggest the genus (Tabanus) and has no information favouring a particular species.

== Use in numismatics ==
Among numismatists (coin collector-research specialists), cf. may be used in references on the paper and/or online coin identification information meaning "compare to". It is common for abbreviations of listings in trusted coin catalogues or sales from certain online auctions to be cited when identifying a particular coin. If the specimen in question is not an exact match but comes close to a known source, cf. may be used.

== See also ==
- Aff. – Taxonomic term
- Viz. – Latin abbreviation meaning "namely"
- Citation signal – Phrases to clarify authority in legal documents
- List of Latin abbreviations
