= R (on the Application of Safe Passage International) v Secretary of State for the Home Department =

2021 High Court of Justice case

- Court: High Court of Justice
- Decided: 2 July 2021
- Citations: [2021] EWHC 1821 (Admin); [2021] WLR(D) 372
- Transcript: Judgment at BAILII

R (on the Application of Safe Passage International) v Secretary of State for the Home Department [2021] EWHC 1821 (Admin), is a judgment of the High Court of Justice of England and Wales.

Safe Passage, challenged the lawfulness of a Home Office policy on Dublin III transfers by way of judicial review. The court found that there were two parts of the policy that were unlawful.

== Background ==
The Dublin III Regulation is a European Union (EU) agreement that "provides a system for allocating responsibility for determining applications for international protection from asylum seekers to member states of the EU". Dublin III provides that unaccompanied minors seeking asylum should be reunited with any family members legally present in another EU member state, and the application for transfer to that member state for reunification should be made in the member state where the family members reside. Dublin III applied to the United Kingdom (UK) as an EU member state until January 1, 2021.

In April 2020, the Home Office changed its policy on Dublin III transfers. One of the changes in policy was that Home Office caseworkers were instructed to refuse a transfer request if their investigation would not meet the two-month deadline to accept or refuse a transfer request, because if they failed to meet the deadline, they would be required to accept the request under Dublin III.

The plaintiff, Safe Passage, challenged the lawfulness of the policy by way of judicial review.

== Facts ==
The plaintiff argued that the guidance in the policy document was unlawful on three main grounds:

- The guidance "provide[d] only for information [regarding the child's family members] to be obtained from the local authority once the family link had been established, which came too late in the process for relevant information to be obtained to inform the [transfer request]".
- The guidance wrongly permitted caseworkers to refuse requests if they would not meet the two-month deadline.
- The practice set out in the guidance regarding "reexamination [review] requests " was unlawful because it misapplied EU case-law.

The Home Office argued that the first ground was not wrong in law because when the guidance was "read as a whole, it is apparent that appropriate inquiries are required to be made by the caseworkers with all relevant bodies, including local authorities" in assessing the transfer requests. In relation to the second ground, the Home Office argued that the guidance was correct and had been "mischaracterised by [the plaintiff]". With regard to the third ground, the Home Office maintained that the guidance concerning reexamination requests was correct and consistent with EU law.

The case was heard by Justice Dingemans and Justice Dove.

== Judgment ==
The court found that there were two parts of the policy that were unlawful. The ruling did not overturn the policy guidance as a whole on the grounds that "there are substantial parts of the policy guidance which are not erroneous in law".

First, the court determined that the policy directing that information should be obtained from the local authority after the family link had been established (ground one) was unlawful because it created "a bright line that the local authority should not undertake an assessment with the family … until the family link had been established", even though the local authority's assessment would assist the Home Office in making an informed decision about whether there was a family link.

The court also found the policy relating to the two-month deadline to be unlawful. The court held it was unlawful because it provided for transfer requests to be refused when inquiries had not yet established whether the family link existed or whether it was in the best interests of the child to have the asylum claim considered in the UK. The court held that "it was not appropriate to reject [transfer requests] because the family link had not been established with sufficient confidence" or when inquiries about whether it was in the child's best interests to determine the claim in the UK were ongoing. The court held that the Home Office "should have carried out sufficient investigations" to be able to answer each of those questions.

Regarding the plaintiff's third ground of challenge, the court found that the Home Office’s policy did not conflict with the EU case law.
