= Campbell Black =

Campbell Black may refer to:

== People ==
- Henry Campbell Black (1860–1927), founder of Black's Law Dictionary
- Tom Campbell Black (1899–1936), English aviator
- Campbell Armstrong (Thomas Campbell Black, 1944–2013), Scottish author who also wrote as "Campbell Black"

== Fictional characters ==
- Rupert Campbell-Black, in the Rutshire Chronicles series of romance novels by Jilly Cooper
