= Docket =

Docket may refer to:

- Docket (court), the official schedule of proceedings in lawsuits pending in a court of law.
- Agenda (meeting) or docket, a list of meeting activities in the order in which they are to be taken up
- Receipt or tax invoice, a proof of payment for items purchased
- Docket (software), formerly DocketAI, a U.S.-based enterprise software company
