= JustCite =

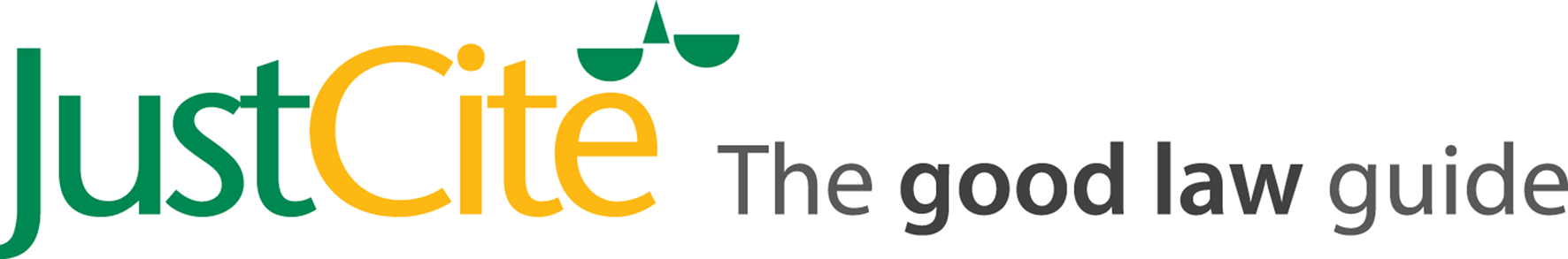

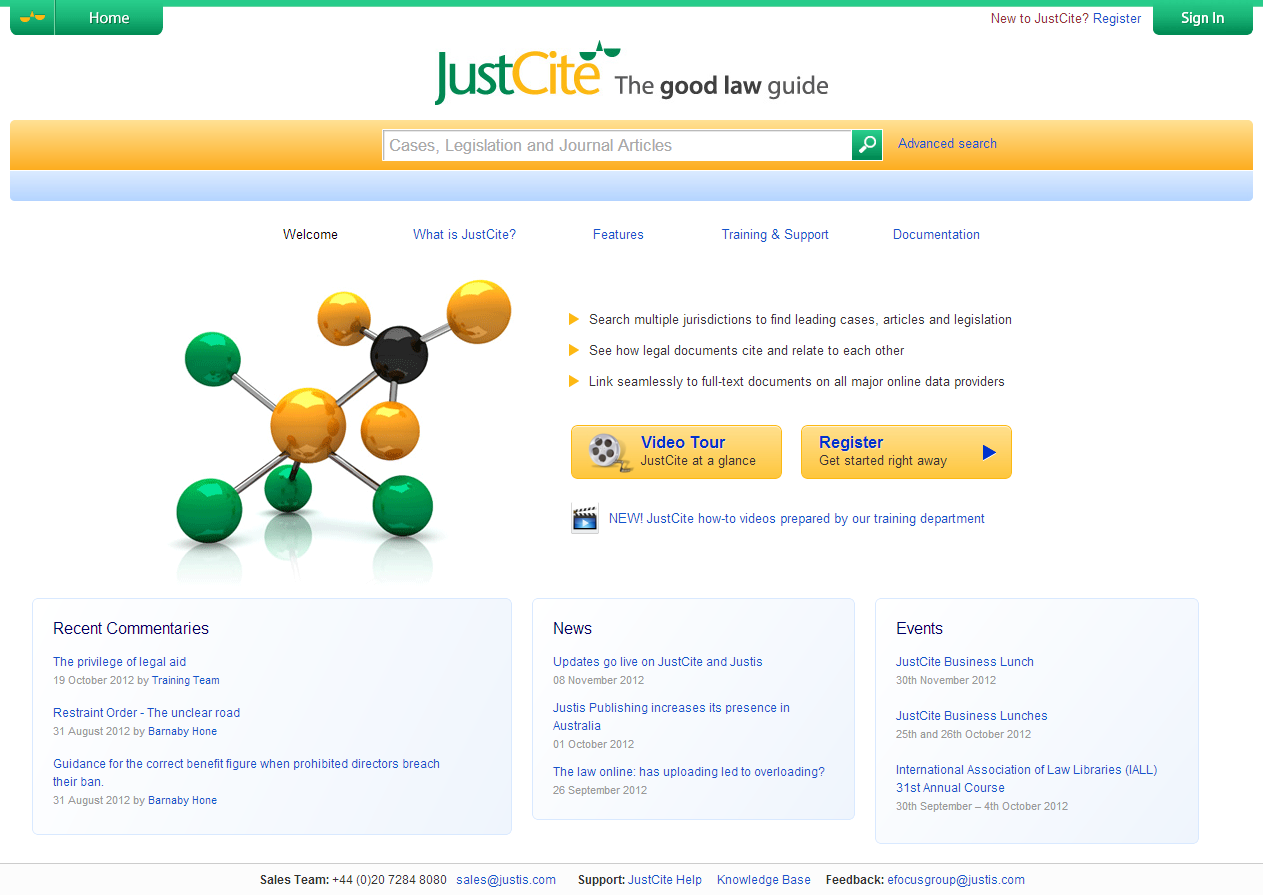
- Website type: Online Law Database
- Owner: Justis Publishing
- Website: www.justcite.com
- Registration: Required
- Launched: 2002
- Current status: Active

JustCite is an online legal research platform from Justis Publishing Ltd. It is designed to help users find leading authorities and establish the current status of the law.

JustCite has a legal search engine, with built-in citation index functionality, that focuses on case law and legislation from common law jurisdictions around the world. It links to content from a range of legal publishers and includes links to full-text material from online legal research services such as BAILII, Casetrack, Informa Law, Justis, LexisNexis and WestLaw. Its international customer base comprises barristers, solicitors, academics, students, governmental departments and researchers. JustCite indexes about two million cases from numerous jurisdictions, including transcripts and unreported judgments, as well as legislation, EU materials and journal articles.

== History ==
JustCite was developed by Justis Publishing Ltd, a company founded in London in 1986, originally trading as Context Ltd. The first version of JustCite was launched by the company in 2002, with the second being rolled out in the summer of 2007 and the third in autumn 2010. Version 3 was a ground-up rewrite of the service featuring a new, modern interface and advanced search technology.

Justis Publishing Ltd (formerly Context Ltd) is an independent publisher of electronic legal information and provider of publishing software and services. The company has been publishing titles online and on CD-ROM since 1986, concentrating particularly on United Kingdom and European Union legal, official and business information. Justis users come from government, industry and commerce, the legal and financial professions and the academic community.

== Features ==
JustCite has a number of tools designed to help users research the law. The Precedent Map is a visual tool that shows the relationship between cases.

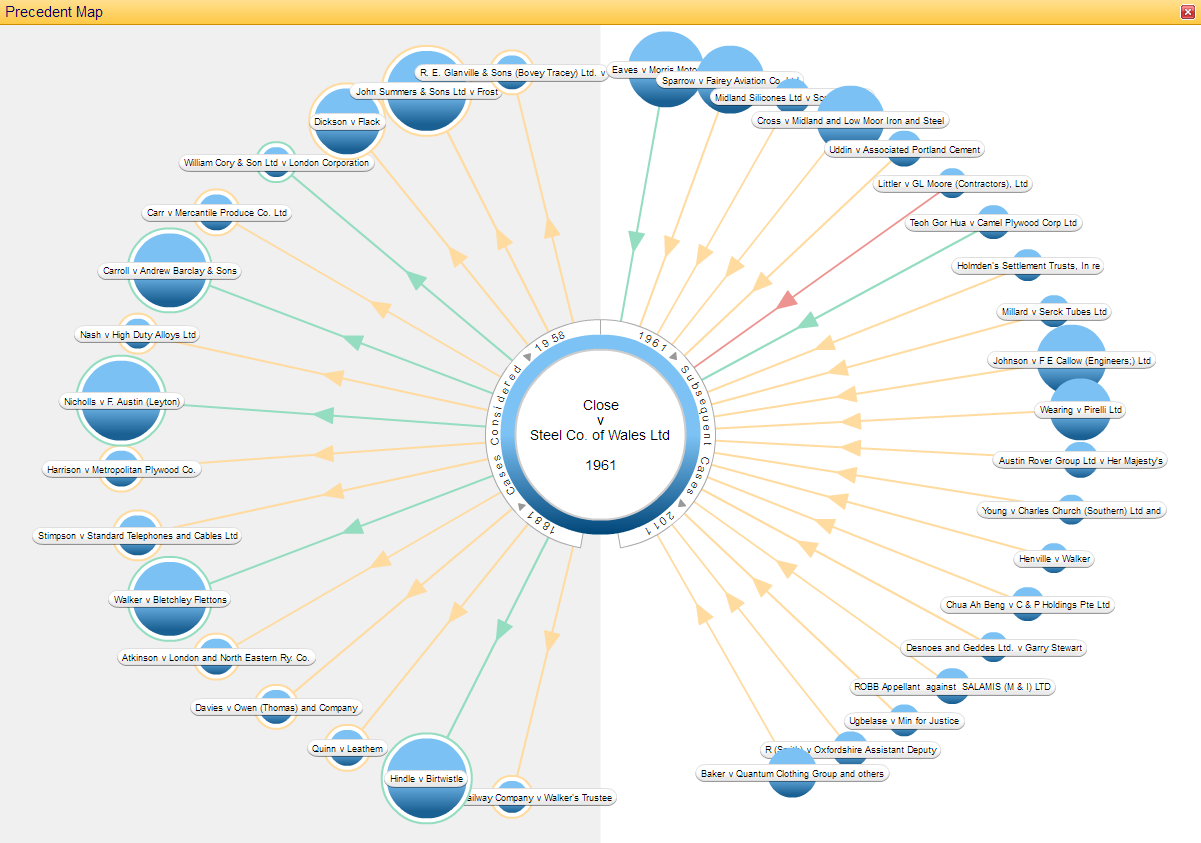
The Precedent Map

== Technology ==
The JustCite service is supported by a number of technologies, such as Microsoft .NET and SQL server platforms, XML, SOAP, AJAX, APIs and various Web 2.0-related applications.
