= Carl Malamud =

Technologist, author, and public domain advocate

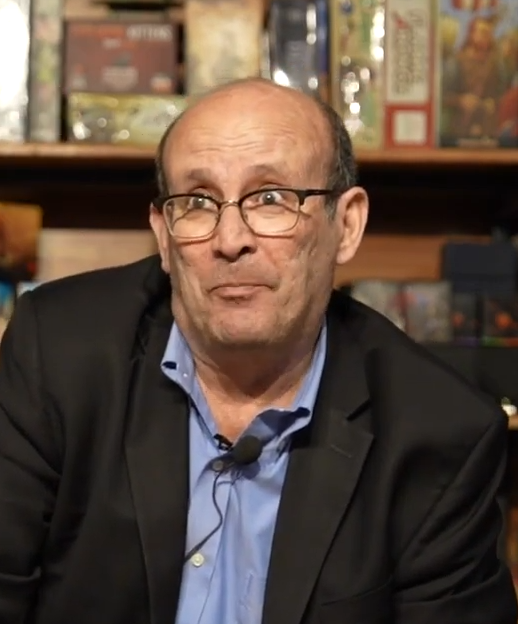
- Malamud in 2024
- Born: July 2, 1959 (age 67)
- Known for: Public.Resource.Org
- Notable work: Exploring the Internet, A World's Fair
- Spouse: Rebecca Hargrave Malamud
- Children: 1
- Awards: 2009 EFF Pioneer Award

Carl Malamud (born July 2, 1959) is an American technologist, author, and public domain advocate, known for his foundation Public.Resource.Org. He was also founder and president of the Internet Multicasting Service, an organization based in Washington D.C. During his time with this group, he was responsible for developing the first Internet radio station, for putting the U.S. Securities and Exchange Commission's EDGAR database on-line, and for creating the Internet 1996 World Exposition.

Malamud is the author of eight books, including Exploring the Internet and A World's Fair. He was a visiting professor at the MIT Media Laboratory and is the former chairman of the Internet Software Consortium. He also is the co-founder of Invisible Worlds, was a fellow at the Center for American Progress, and was a board member of the non-profit Mozilla Foundation.

== Public domain activism ==
Malamud set up the nonprofit Public.Resource.Org, headquartered in Sebastopol, California, to work for the publication of public domain information from local, state, and federal government agencies. Among his achievements have been digitizing 588 government films for the Internet Archive and YouTube, publishing a 5 million page crawl of the Government Printing Office, and persuading the state of Oregon to not assert copyright over its legislative statutes. He has also been active in challenging the state of California's copyright claims on state laws by publishing copies of the criminal, building, and plumbing codes online.

He has also challenged the information management policy of Smithsonian Networks, convinced C-SPAN to liberalize its video archive access policy, and begun publishing court decisions. In 2009 he proposed, through the "Yes We Scan" campaign, that he serve as the Public Printer of the U.S., the head of the Government Printing Office. He is leading an effort, under the banner of Law.gov, to bring online all primary legal materials (including legal codes and case law) for open public access.

An early Internet pioneer, he is the author of many early books about networking such as Analyzing Novell Networks and DEC Networks and Architectures.

In September 2015, Malamud published a petition to the Government of the United Kingdom, calling for it to make the safety standards published by the European Union for toy safety freely available, rather than allowing them to continue being only available at high cost and subject to restrictive terms of use.

=== PACER ===
In 2008, Malamud contended that the federal court archive Public Access to Electronic Court Records, which was charging 8 cents per page, should instead be providing the information for free, because government documents are not protected by copyright. The fees were "plowed back to the courts to finance technology, but the system [ran] a budget surplus of some $150 million, according to court reports," reported The New York Times. PACER used technology that was "designed in the bygone days of screechy telephone modems ... put[ting] the nation's legal system behind a wall of cash and kludge." Malamud appealed to fellow activists, urging them to visit one of 17 libraries conducting a free trial of the PACER system, download court documents, and send them to him for public distribution.

After reading Malamud's call for action, Aaron Swartz used a Perl computer script running on Amazon cloud servers to download the documents, using credentials belonging to a Sacramento library. From September 4 to 20, 2008, Swartz's software accessed documents and uploaded them to a cloud computing service. He released the documents to Malamud's organization.

The Huffington Post characterized his actions this way: "Swartz downloaded public court documents from the PACER system in an effort to make them available outside of the expensive service. The move drew the attention of the FBI, which ultimately decided not to press charges as the documents, were, in fact, public."

On September 29, 2008, the GPO suspended the free trial, "pending an evaluation" of the program. Swartz's actions were subsequently investigated by the FBI. The case was closed after two months with no charges filed. Swartz learned the details of the investigation as a result of filing a Freedom of Information Act (FOIA) request with the FBI and described their response as the "usual mess of confusions that shows the FBI's lack of sense of humor." PACER still charges per page, but customers have the option of saving the documents for free public access with a browser extension called RECAP.

At a 2013 memorial for Swartz, Malamud recalled their work with PACER. They brought millions of U.S. District Court records out from behind PACER's "pay wall", he said, and found them full of privacy violations, including medical records and the names of minor children and confidential informants.

We sent our results to the Chief Judges of 31 District Courts ... They redacted those documents and they yelled at the lawyers that filed them ... The Judicial Conference changed their privacy rules. ... [To] the bureaucrats who ran the Administrative Office of the United States Courts ... we were thieves that took $1.6 million of their property. So they called the FBI ... [The FBI] found nothing wrong ...

Malamud penned a more detailed account of his collaboration with Swartz on the Pacer project in an essay.

Writing in Ars Technica, Timothy Lee, who later made use of the documents obtained by Swartz as a co-creator of RECAP, offered some insight into discrepancies in reporting on just how much data Swartz had downloaded: "In a back-of-the-envelope calculation a few days before the offsite crawl was shut down, Swartz guessed he got around 25 percent of the documents in PACER. The New York Times similarly reported Swartz had downloaded "an estimated 20 percent of the entire database". Based on the facts that Swartz downloaded 2.7 million documents while PACER, at the time, contained 500 million, Lee concluded that Swartz downloaded less than one percent of the database.

=== State of Georgia statutes copyright decision ===
On October 18, 2018, a federal appeals court decision struck down the State of Georgia's attempt to claim that its officially published statutes were protected by copyright due to the addition of annotations. Although the state's Code Revision Commission did not claim that the statutes themselves were copyrighted, they believed that their annotated work could only be distributed by the state's chosen commercial publisher, Lexis-Nexis.

Carl Malamud initiated the copyright challenge by purchasing the official printed works for more than $1200, digitally scanning the contents, and mailing the digital copies on USB flash memory drives to every Georgia legislator.

In 2013, the State of Georgia sued Malamud for providing the Official Code of Georgia Annotated on his website, borrowing his own word to describe it as "a successful form of 'terrorism'".

The appeals court decision states:

"... we conclude that the People are the ultimate authors of the annotations. As a work of the People the annotations are inherently public domain material and therefore uncopyrightable. Because we conclude that no copyright can be held in the annotations, we have no occasion to address the parties’ other arguments regarding originality and fair use."

In 2019 Malamud expressed a wish for the matter to advance to the Supreme Court for clarification, despite the appellate court ruling in his favor.

=== Other pending lawsuits ===
Carl Malamud is currently involved in several lawsuits through his organization Public.Resource.Org.

=== General Index ===
With his nonprofit foundation Public Resource, he released an index of words and phrases from academic papers, the General Index, in 2021.

== Malamud's campaign to become US Public Printer ==
In 2009 Malamud announced his candidacy to become Public Printer of the United States and asked for the public to endorse him for the position. The role is filled by an appointment by the president and it is unusual that it would be the subject of a public campaign. Malamud sought the position on a platform of promising to "make all primary legal materials produced by the U.S. readily available" and to include "principles of bulk data distribution in legislation."

The Electronic Frontier Foundation said that his agenda was "ambitious and impressive" and that if President Barack Obama granted him the position that it would be an excellent step toward fulfilling his promise to introduce "an unprecedented level of openness in Government."

== Recognition ==
In 2009 Malamud received the EFF Pioneer Award from the Electronic Frontier Foundation for being a public domain advocate.

== Works ==
Malamud authored eight books as of 2009, including Exploring the Internet and A World's Fair.

=== 10 Rules for Radicals ===
10 Rules for Radicals is Malamud's keynote at the 19th World Wide Web Consortium conference in April 2010. It's a slim and often humorous account of interaction with various bureaucracies and how to make public sector information more accessible.

It sums up:

- Rule 1: Call everything an experiment.
- Rule 2: When the starting gun goes off, run really fast. As a small player, the elephant can step on you, but you can outrun the elephant.
- Rule 3: Eyeballs rule. If a million people use your service, and on the Internet you can do that, you’ve got a lot more credibility than if you’re just issuing position papers and flaming the man.
- Rule 4: When the time comes, be nice.
- Rule 5: Keep asking until they say yes. Gordon Bell, the inventor of the VAX, once said that you should keep your vision, but modify your plan.
- Rule 6: When you get the microphone, get to the point. Be clear about what you want.
- Rule 7: Get standing. Have some skin in the game, some reason you’re at the table.
- Rule 8: Get them to threaten you.
- Rule 9: Look for overreaching, things that are just blatantly, obviously wrong or silly.
- And finally, rule 10, which is don’t be afraid to fail. It took Thomas Edison 10,000 times before he got the lightbulb right, and when he was asked about those failures, he said “I have not failed, I’ve just found 10,000 ways that won’t work.” Fail. Fail often. And don’t forget, you can question authority.
