= Filing (law) =

Delivery of a document to a court clerk

In law, filing is the delivery of a document to the clerk of a court and the acceptance of the document by the clerk for placement into the official record. If a document is delivered to the clerk and is temporarily placed or deposited with the court (but is not accepted for filing), it is said to have been lodged with or received by the court (but not filed). Courts will not consider motions unless an appropriate memorandum or brief is filed before the appropriate deadline. Usually a filing fee is paid which is part of court costs.

== Filing systems ==
In civil procedure systems, filing rules can be mandatory or permissive. In a mandatory filing system, all documents of legal importance exchanged between the parties must also be concurrently filed with the court, while in a permissive filing system, nothing needs to be filed until the case reaches a point where direct judicial management is absolutely necessary (such as the brink of trial).

For example, the United States federal courts operate on a mandatory filing system (with minor exceptions for the most routine discovery exchanges). In contrast, from the reign of Edward IV during the late 1400s to the late 1990s (that is, before the 1998 promulgation of the Civil Procedure Rules), the trial courts of England and Wales normally did not maintain comprehensive pretrial case files (beyond recording the issuance of a writ to initiate a legal proceeding). Instead, after service of a writ, the parties merely served their pleadings on each other, then at some point in time, one party would ask the court to set down the case for trial (that is, put the case on a list of cases awaiting the setting or "fixture" of trial dates) and lodge two copies of the pleadings with the court (along with other documents relevant to the planned trial). Even after they had been lodged (i.e., temporarily deposited) with the court, the pleadings were not filed immediately. Rather, one copy was for the personal use of the judge, while the other copy would be officially filed after the trial together with the judgment to establish the court's permanent record of the issues that had been formally adjudicated at trial.

In the United States, a permissive filing system has persisted to the present in the state of New York, which was modified in 1992 but still largely operates in its traditional form in certain lower courts.

Filing may also refer to submission of a form to a government agency, with or without an accompanying fee.

== Filing methods ==
Filing traditionally has been performed by visiting a clerk at a filing window, paying a filing fee by cash, check, or credit card, and submitting the document to be filed in duplicate or even triplicate. For each document filed, the court clerk inspects the document to ensure compliance with the court's rules on how legal documents should be formatted, verifies that the filer has not been declared a vexatious litigant, and confirms that the case number and caption are for a valid case.

Next, the court clerk then stamps both copies with a large stamp that indicates the name of the court and the date the document was filed, then keeps one copy for the court's files and returns one copy to the filer for the filer's own records. In certain jurisdictions, the clerk will stamp duplicate copies returned to the filer as "file-conformed" or "conformed copy" rather than "filed". These stamps mean the duplicate copy appears to conform to the appearance of the original document, and in turn, a copy bearing such a stamp can be submitted with later filings as evidence of the earlier act of filing. But the "filed" stamp is reserved for the original document that goes into the court file, and will be seen outside that file only if one obtains a certified copy photocopied directly from the original document on file.

In courts that require triplicate submissions, the third copy is then taken (either by the clerk or by the filer) to the chambers or courtroom of the judge assigned to the case. The clerk then adds the document to the docket for the case as well as any related deadlines or events.

If the document is the first pleading filed in a case (usually the complaint), the court clerk also assigns a new case number and opens a new file for the case.

A newer phenomenon is electronic filing, in which lawyers simply upload Portable Document Format electronic documents to a secure website maintained either by the court (for example, the U.S. has CM/ECF) or by a private commercial service like LexisNexis. This is convenient in that many courts can now accept filings at all hours, rather than only during regular business hours. Where e-filing is in effect, the filer is normally required to lodge a "courtesy copy" (that is, a conventional paper copy) at the chambers of the assigned judge by the next business day. The courtesy copy of the filing is merely used to decide the motion at issue and is discarded when no longer needed, since the electronic file is now the court's master copy of the case file.

== Filing fees ==
Generally, filing fees are controversial because some individuals believe that they impede access to justice. Although American litigants complain about fees all the time (for example, it costs $435 to file a complaint in Los Angeles), the American system is considered to be quite plaintiff-friendly by experts on comparative law.

Many legal systems have filing fees for complaints that are proportional to the amount sought. Thus, the greater the damages sought, the higher the fee to file.

Even when one seeks a waiver for grossly unfair fees, courts tend to waive only the amount in excess of the plaintiff's total assets, with the result that just to initiate a meritorious case, an already severely injured or damaged plaintiff may have to go bankrupt. What some consider to be the inherent unfairness of this system as actually implemented in Austria resulted in a U.S. Supreme Court decision, Republic of Austria v. Altmann (2004).
