= Kalocsa Airfield =

Former Hungarian Air Force base

Kalocsa Airfield
- Légierő reptér Kalocsa
- Kalocsa, Bács-Kiskun County in Hungary

Site information
- Owner: Hungarian National Defence Association
- Operator: Hungarian Air Force
- Condition: Abandoned

Location
- Shown within Hungary
- Coordinates: 46°33′00″N 18°56′25″E

Site history
- Built: 1951
- In use: 1953 - 1990
- Fate: Closed

Airfield information
- Identifiers: ICAO: LHKA
Runways
Direction	Length and surface
17/35	2,500 metres (8,202 ft) Concrete

Kalocsa Airfield, also known as Fokto Airfield (ICAO: LHKA) was a Hungarian Air Force base located in Kalocsa, Bács-Kiskun County, Hungary. It was under Hungarian Air Force ownership from 1951 until 1956, when the Red Army occupied the airfield until 1990, leading to abandonment.

== History ==
Kalocsa Airfield originally served as an emergency landing ground during World War II. It had a grass landing ground measuring 550 x 550 meters equipped with poor drainage. On 22 July, 1944, it was reported as being disused from many months.

Kalocsa Airfield began construction in 1951 by the Hungarian military. During the winter of 1952/53, around 1,000 workers, mainly internees and forced laborers, were employed for the construction of the airfield. Deportees from Budapest, some of whom were over the age of seventy, also participated in the construction work. Additionally, a railway spur extended from Kalocsa Railway Station to the airfield was installed to facilitate the transportation of materials. By the summer of 1953, Kalocsa Airfield was completed, and a fighter regiment of the Hungarian Air Force equipped with Mikoyan-Gurevich MiG-15s began flying from the airfield. The unit was staffed by 80 to 100 men stationed at the airfield. Daily air activity involved jet aircraft, some flew individually and some flew in formations of three. The airfield was equipped with 3 large hangars with vaulted roofing, smaller buildings, and a two-story building. It operated a 2,500 meter long runway, with three taxiways from the western end leading to three concrete aprons each equipped with a hangar. In 1954, the command of Kalocsa Airfield and the air units headquarters were based in a formerly used palace belonging to the Archbishop.

=== Soviet occupation ===
In 1956, the Red Army occupied Kalocsa Airfield, and fighter-bombers of the 14th Guards Fighter Aviation Regiment began operating from the airfield. Barracks and blocks of flats were built near the airport, and then 60 helicopter landing pads on both sides of the runway. Kalocsa Airfield was used by Soviet airmen under the call sign "Verchovod". This caused the airspace to be strictly forbidden for civilian and sports aviation, drawing out local aviation enthusiasts to aero clubs in Szeged, Kiskunfélegyháza, Szolnok, Budapest and Baja. The fighter bomber units remained until 1960, when they were relocated to Kiskunlacháza. Following the relocation, pilot and parachutist training was provided by specialist organizations of the army, under supervision of the Hungarian National Defence Association (MHSZ). In 1966, a cooperation agreement was signed by the headquarters of the Soviet Southern Army and the MHSZ, allowing Hungarian parachutists to jump from Soviet helicopters based in the airfield. From 1969 to 1971, the Hungarian National Parachutist Team used the airfield.

=== Post occupation ===
In 1990, the Red Army occupation ended after Soviet troops were withdrawn, leaving an extensive amount of environmental pollution. Subsequently, attempts were made to remove the soil pollution, however continuation was hindered by financial constraints. Local airsports began reorganizing through the Bácska Hang-gliding Club's efforts. There were attempts to use the airfield for the 1996 World Fair, however the very high initial price and later cancelling of the World Fair made the plan discontinue. Despite multiple offers, the former airfield remained closed without an operational permit. Facilities located in the airfield remained under armed protection, but deteriorated due to weather conditions.

The Bácska Aeroclub began renting a hangar a few hundred-meter long grass field in the northern part of the airfield. The Flyers for Kalocsa Fund was established, aiming to preserve the airfield and continue environmental clean-ups. Eventually, parachuting gained popularity, and more than 30 parachutists began baling daily. In May 1995, a surface oil storage was proposed to be built on the former airport, which would have forced the aero club to relocate to an unsuitable grassy area near the dumping ground of Kalocsa.

== Present ==
On 11 October, 1995, the Aeroport Kalocsa Flyers Association was established. Following efforts of the managing director of the club, the airport was granted a temporary operating permit in February 1996. In 1997, the village of Uszód did not sign the temporary permission, limiting civil aviation operations from the airfield. Only the southern 800 meters of the runway is usable, with the rest unusable due to the land dispute with the nearby village. Today, the club still operates out of the airfield.
