= Paragraf Lex =

Paragraf Lex is a Serbian-language computer-assisted legal research service based in Novi Sad. It was the only Serbian law database listed in a 2018 legal reference on Serbian criminal law.
