= New Zealand Legal Information Institute =

Public legal database

The New Zealand Legal Information Institute (NZLII) is operated by the University of Otago faculty of law with assistance from the University of Canterbury and Victoria University of Wellington. It contains more than 100 databases of New Zealand law, including many decision from courts and tribunals that are not available from commercial providers or anywhere else. It operates using voluntary labour and grants from the New Zealand Law Foundation. NZLII is a member of the Free Access to Law Movement.
