= Cello (web browser) =

Web browser

Cello WWW Browser
- An Internet browser from the Cornell Legal Information Institute.
- Original author: Thomas R. Bruce
- Developer: Legal Information Institute at Cornell Law School
- Release: 8 June 1993; 33 years ago
- Final release: 1.01a / 16 April 1994; 32 years ago
- Written in: C++, makes "heavy use of Borland Object Windows libraries"
- Operating system: Windows 3.1 / 3.11, OS/2, Windows NT 3.5
- Size: 325 kb
- Available in: English
- Type: Web browser
- License: Shareware/Proprietary
- Website: www.law.cornell.edu at the Wayback Machine (archived 1998-12-03)

Cello is an early, discontinued graphical web browser for Windows 3.1; it was developed by Thomas R. Bruce of the Legal Information Institute at Cornell Law School. It was released as shareware in 1993. While other browsers ran on various Unix machines, Cello was the first web browser for Microsoft Windows, using the winsock system to access the Internet. In addition to the basic Windows, Cello worked on Windows NT 3.5 and with small modifications on OS/2.

Cello was created because of a demand for Web access by lawyers, who were more likely to use Microsoft Windows than the Unix operating systems supporting earlier Web browsers, including the first release of Mosaic. The lack of a Windows browser meant many legal experts were unable to access legal information made available in hypertext on the World Wide Web. Cello was popular during 1993/1994, but fell out of favor following the release of Mosaic for Windows and Netscape, after which Cello development was abandoned. (Note: You can view yahoo browser statistics at https://web.archive.org/web/20021204042351/http://www.cen.uiuc.edu/~ejk/bryl/ which show Cello being used.)

Cello was first publicly released on 8 June 1993. A version 2.0 was announced, but development was abandoned. Version 1.01a, 16 April 1994, was the last public release. Since then, the Legal Information Institute at Cornell Law School has licensed the Cello 2.0 source code, which has been used to develop commercial software.

The browser is no longer available from its original homepage. (Note: The original cello site at is no longer up. The original ftp site at ftp://ftp.law.cornell.edu/pub/LII/Cello is no longer up. The original gopher server at gopher.law.cornell.edu:70/11/listservs/cellol/ is no longer up.) However, it can still be downloaded from mirror sites. (Note: Cello can still be downloaded at https://browsers.evolt.org/browsers/archive/cello .)

== Development and history ==
The icon prior to version 1

The development of Cello started in 1992, with beta versions planned for June 1993 and a release for July 1993. It was publicly announced on 12 April 1993.

The Legal Information Institute at Cornell Law School created the first law site on the Internet in 1992 and the first legal website in 1993. However, at the time, there were no web browsers for the Microsoft Windows operating system, which was used by most lawyers. Thus, to allow lawyers to use their website, the Legal Information Institute developed the first Windows-based Web browser. This was made possible by a grant from the National Center for Automated Information Research. (Note: This can be seen in the "About Cello" dialog in Cello. It is also stated in the "Notices, Acknowledgments, Disclaimers" section of the included .hlp file in Cello.)

Although other browsers at the time were based on CERN's WWW libraries called libwww, PCs of the time were not powerful enough to run the UNIX-oriented code. As a result, Thomas Bruce had to rewrite most of the WWW libraries to work on Microsoft Windows. Unlike most commercial browsers at that time, Cello used none of Mosaic's source code and thus had a different look and feel.

Steven Sinofsky, president of the Windows division at Microsoft wrote in a June 1994 email: We do not currently plan on any other client software [in the upcoming release of Windows 95], especially something like Mosaic or Cello. Nevertheless, on 11 January 1995, Microsoft announced that it had licensed the Mosaic technology from Spyglass, which it would use to create Internet Explorer. On 15 August 1995, Microsoft debuted its own web browser Internet Explorer 1 for Windows 95. While it did not ship with the original release of Windows 95, it shipped with Microsoft Plus! for Windows 95.

== Usage ==
When released in 1993, Cello was the only browser for the Microsoft Windows platform. Shortly after launch, Cello was being downloaded at a rate of 500 copies per day. As such, it achieved a fair amount of use and recognition within the legal community, including a number of PC users with between 150,000 and 200,000 users. In 1994, most websites were visited using either the Cello browser or the Mosaic browser. Despite having fewer features than Mosaic, Cello continued to be used due to its simpler interface and lower system requirements. Cello was praised for being easy to install, because it wasn't necessary to install Win32s or a TCP/IP stack for Windows 3.1. Following the release of Windows 95, which offered a much better TCP/IP interface, Cello fell into disuse and was abandoned.

By 1995, Cello, like the Mosaic browser, was overshadowed by two newer browsers — Netscape and Internet Explorer — and fell into disuse. By 1999, Cello was considered to be a "historical" browser.

Cello is considered to be one of the early casualties of the first browser wars.

== Features ==
Cello had the following features:

- inline graphics support: GIF, XBM, PCX, and BMP.
- PostScript viewing and sound playback
- File saving and printing.
- Editing support for local files via an external editor. Integration with the HTMLAssistant Windows-based HTML helper/editor.
- File caching ad infinitum using a file-based cache with user-specified "low water mark".
- DDE and OLE drag-and-drop support. Cello can be invoked and controlled through the use of DDE macros in other programs. URL arguments on the command line are also supported.
- "Peek mode", permitting partial retrieval of files of large or unknown size.
- Local file mode for HTML delivery on standalone machines or machines with LAN connections only.
- Support for HTML "mailto:" scheme with integrated email sending client.
- Support for the full HTML+ ISO-LATIN character set, including specialized legal symbols, foreign characters, etc.
- User-selectable sound players, viewers, editor, and Telnet and TN3270 clients.
- Comprehensive online documentation in Windows Help format.
- Simple user interface.
- Fully extensible support for viewing downloaded files in an unlimited number of PC-binary file formats using the standard Windows Associate... scheme.
- Bookmarks
- Local browsing
- Simpler interface (compared to Mosaic)

Unlike Mosaic, Cello did not have toolbar buttons, and instead commands were accessed through pull-down menus.

Supported Protocols

Cello supported the following protocols: HTTP 1.0, Gopher (but not Gopher+), read-only FTP, SMTP mailing, Telnet, Usenet, CSO/ph/qi directly and WAIS, HyTelnet, TechInfo, Archie, X.500, TN3270 and a number of others through public gateways.

Supported FTP servers

Cello supported the following FTP servers: most Unix servers (including SunOS, System V, and Linux), IBM VM, VMS systems, Windows NT, QVTNet, NCSA/CUTCP/Rutgers PC servers, FTP Software PC server, HellSoft NLM for Novell.

Internet Connection

Cello works best with a direct Ethernet connection, but it also supports SLIP and PPP dialup connections through the use of asynchronous sockets. Cello has an integrated TCP/IP runtime stack.

== Release history ==
The following versions were released:

16-bit Cello Releases
Version	Date	Development cycle	Exe size (in kb)	Download	Notes
0.1	8 June 1993	Beta	347	evolt	Requires Distinct to run
0.2	14 June 1993	Beta	?	?	Changelog
0.3	16 June 1993	Beta	?	?	Changelog
0.4	18 June 1993	Beta	?	?	Changelog
0.5	24 June 1993	Beta	?	?	Changelog
0.6	30 June 1993	Beta	?	?	Changelog
WINSOCK alpha r3	6 September 1993	Alpha	374		Double click to visit link, right click to show url. Browser request contain only a GET line. Doesn't support redirections
WINSOCK alpha r6	14 October 1993	Alpha	362	(cello-ws.zip)	Browser request contain only a GET line. Doesn't support redirections
0.8	5 November 1993	Beta	—N/a	—N/a	Changelog (Distinct version discontinued)
0.9 (Note: Given in the "about Cello" - windows in Cello .9 beta)	12 November 1993	Beta-pre	?	?	
0.9 (Note: Given in the "README.1ST" of Cello)	16 November 1993	Beta	487		Changelog. GET requests use presently invalid protocol version. Redirections are supported. Crashes on pages with unsupported image files
0.9 (Note: Given in the "DEFAULT.HTML" of Cello .9)	22 November 1993	WINSOCK alpha r9.2	494		Issues from 0.9 beta still present. New issue: in img tag, src must be the last attribute
1.0	17 February 1994	Release	?	evolt	
1.01	?	Release	?	?	
1.01a	17 March 1994	release	521	, evolt	Cello's splash screen. Note that the image is not that of a cello, but rather a viola da gamba, its aristocratic predecessor Changelog
2.0	—N/a	Alpha	—N/a	—N/a	A screenshot of Cello 2.0 in development. development ceased, first version to support HTML forms

Although Cello 2.0 had been announced, development ceased before a public release.

IBM released a fix for their TCP/IP V2.0 stack so that Cello would work with OS/2 WinOS/2 on 9 February 1994.

== Browser comparison table ==
The following table shows how Cello compared to browsers of its time.

Comparison of Web Browsers
Browser		Cello	NCSA X-Mosaic	NCSA Mosaic	Netscape Navigator	Spyglass Mosaic	AIR Mosaic	InternetWorks	Win-Tapestry	IBM WebExplorer
Operating system		Win	UNIX	Win	Win	Win	Win	Win	Win	OS/2
Version		1	2.4	2.0 alpha 3	1	1.02	3.06	Beta 4	1.67	0.91
proxy		No	Yes	No	Yes	Partial	Yes	Yes	Partial	Partial
extended html		No	No	No	Yes	No	No	No	No	No
Performance
Performance	multithreading	No	No	No	Yes	No	No	Yes	Yes	No
Performance	dynamic linking	No	No	No	Yes	No	No	Yes	No	No
Performance	deferred image	No	No	No	Yes	No	Yes	Yes	Yes	No
Performance	multi-pane	No	No	No	No	No	No	Yes	No	No
Performance	multi-window	No	No	No	No	No	No	No	Yes	No
Configurability
Configurability	kiosk mode	No	No	No	No	No	Yes	No	No	Yes
Configurability	external players	Yes	No	No	Yes	No	No	Yes	Yes	Yes
Integration
Integration	d&d to clipboard	No	No	No	No	No	Yes	No	Yes	No
Integration	spawnable players	No	Partial	Partial	Yes	Partial	Yes	Yes	Partial	Yes
Integration	search engine(Find)	Yes	No	No	Yes	No	No	No	No	No
Navigation
Navigation	hotlist	No	Yes	Yes	No	Yes	Yes	Yes	No	Yes
Navigation	bookmark	Yes	No	No	Yes	No	No	No	Yes	No
Navigation	folders	Yes	Yes	Yes	Yes	No	Yes	Yes	Yes	No
Navigation	categories (tags)	No	No	No	No	No	No	No	Yes	No
Navigation	menu/button bar	No	No	Yes	No	No	Yes	No	No	No
Navigation	import	Yes	No	No	Yes	No	Yes	No	Yes	No
Navigation	export	Yes	No	No	Yes	Yes	Yes	No	No	No
Navigation	annotation	No	Yes	Yes	Yes	No	No	No	Yes	No
Navigation	auto time stamp	No	No	No	Yes	No	No	No	No	No
Source: Berghel, Hal (1996). "The client's side of the World-Wide Web". Communications of the ACM. 39 (1): 30–40. doi:10.1145/234173.234177. ISSN 0001-0782. S2CID 2003788.

== Derivatives ==
- The first edition of BURKS, a project to produce non-profit CD-ROMs of resources for students of Computer Science, was based on Cello.
- InterAp, by California Software Inc, was based on Cello and featured a web browser with Telnet, FTP, and a Visual Basic-compatible scripting language called NetScripts.
- A version of Lovelace came bundled with Cello.

== Technical ==
While originally Cello required the Distinct Corporation's TCP/IP stack, with the release of Cello Beta Version .8, Cello dropped support for Distinct, and became exclusively Winsock-based.

Originally, although Cello could run on OS/2, OS/2's implementation of Winsock had bugs that prevented Cello from accessing the Internet. The bug, APAR #PN52335, was later fixed allowing Cello to properly work on OS/2.

The user agent for Cello is LII-Cello/<version> libwww/2.5.

=== DDE support ===
Cello featured Dynamic Data Exchange (DDE) support. OLE support and DDE client support were planned, but never released.

An example of how to invoke Cello from a Microsoft Word macro:

Sub MAIN
ChanNum = DDEInitiate("Cello", "URL")
DDEExecute(ChanNum, "http://www.law.cornell.edu")
DDETerminate(ChanNum)
End Sub

== System requirements ==
Cello has the following system requirements:

- Processor: 80386(386SX) at 16 MHz or better
- Operating system: Windows 3.1 / 3.11 / Windows NT 3.5 / OS/2.
- Ram: 2 MB RAM, 4 MB RAM recommended
- A TCP/IP connection running Winsock

== Criticism ==
Cello was not very stable and its development halted early.

Cello did not render graphics well and required that the user reload the webpage when resizing the window. Like most browsers at the time, Cello also did not support any web security protocols. It was also said that Cello rendered HTML "crudely" and pages would appear jaggedly.

Cello also had sub-par performance in accessing the Internet and processing hypermedia documents.

== See also ==
- Lynx
- Mosaic
- MacWeb
- Libwww

== Bibliography ==
- Romano, Nicholas C.; Nunamaker, Jay F.; Briggs, Robert O.; Vogel, Doug (1998). "Architecture, Design, and Development of an HTML/JavaScript Web-Based Group Support System". Journal of the American Society for Information Science. 49 (7): 649–667. doi:10.1002/(SICI)1097-4571(19980515)49:7<649::AID-ASI6>3.0.CO;2-1. SSRN 937380.
- Grier, D.A. (2008). "Evolutionary Fervor". Computer. 41 (12): 10–12. doi:10.1109/MC.2008.529. ISSN 0018-9162. S2CID 9327151.
- Jagodzinski, Cecile (1997). "Cooperative Web Weaving". Journal of Interlibrary Loan, Document Delivery & Information Supply. 8 (2): 1–20. doi:10.1300/J110V08N02_01. ISSN 1072-303X.
- Berners-Lee, Tim (1 January 1997). "The World Wide Web - Past, Present and Future". Journal of Digital Information. 1 (1). ISSN 1368-7506.
