= WIPO Judicial Institute =

The WIPO Judicial Institute was established in 2019 to coordinate and lead WIPO’s work with national and regional judiciaries. This work includes convening international meetings between judges, implementing judicial capacity building activities, producing resources and publications for use by judges, and administering the WIPO Lex database that provides free public access to intellectual property (IP) laws, treaties and judicial decisions from around the world. WIPO has also established an Advisory Board of Judges, currently comprising 12 members who serve in their capacity.

== Judiciaries in the IP ecosystem ==
National and regional courts are tasked with protecting and enforcing IP rights under the applicable national law. As expressed by Professor Reto M. Hilty, “without effective enforcement, intellectual property rights are nothing but empty shells”. The World Trade Organization’s (WTO) Agreement on Trade-Related Aspects of Intellectual Property Rights (TRIPS Agreement) includes a recognition that enforcement of IP rights should contribute to the promotion of innovation in a manner that is conducive to social and economic welfare. Intellectual property presents challenges for judicial adjudication, both because of its technical complexity but also its significant societal implications, as shown in the continuing growth in IP filings worldwide and the developments described by Professor Jacques de Werra as a “perceivable trend towards specialisation or centralisation of certain types of IP disputes.”

== International judicial dialogue ==
The institute's international meetings for judges bring together hundreds of judges from all continents to discuss questions and issues that commonly arise in adjudication of intellectual property disputes. These meetings are open to members of national and regional judiciaries, as well as quasi-judicial bodies that handle intellectual property disputes, such as Boards of Appeal in IP Offices in some jurisdictions. The purpose of the meetings is to enable exchange of information and experiences, to be informed about the approaches of different countries while recognizing the differences between national legal and judicial systems.

The institute's flagship event is the annual WIPO IP Judges Forum, which takes place in November each year. In 2020, the Forum was attended by roughly 400 judges from 89 national and regional courts. Also in 2020, during the COVID-19 pandemic, a series of WIPO Webinars for Judges was established.

The benefits of an open approach to transnational judicial dialogue have been described by jurists and scholars. Justice Stephen Breyer of the US Supreme Court has observed that, although courts apply their laws, the experiences of other countries’ courts may “cast an empirical light on the consequences of different solutions to a common legal problem.” More recently, President Zhou Qiang of the Supreme People's Court of China has advocated the strengthening of international judicial exchanges and cooperation in the realm of IP law.

== Judicial capacity building ==
The Institute partners with national and regional judicial authorities to provide capacity building activities for judges. Judicial capacity building activities take different forms, depending on the needs and interests of the country, as well as the specific national legal, economic and social context. They include national and regional activities on specific topics; continuing judicial education programs to introduce intellectual property modules into the standard training provided to new and sitting judges by national authorities; an annual Master Class on Intellectual Property Adjudication for experienced intellectual property judges, which is conducted in collaboration with a national court, such as the U.S. Court of Appeals for Federal Circuit in 2019; and incorporation of the WIPO Academy's Distance Learning Course on Intellectual Property for Judges.

== Resources ==
The Institute produces resources and publications to support judges in adjudicating IP disputes. In 2019, WIPO and the Hague Conference on Private International Law (HCCH) co-published “When Private International Law Meets Intellectual Property Law – A Guide for Judges”, which examines how private international law operates in IP matters. In 2021, WIPO and HCCH launched a survey to identify actual and practical private international law issues in IP disputes, namely in establishing court jurisdiction, determining and applying the applicable law, recognizing or enforcing foreign intellectual property-related judgments, and where relevant, administrative and judicial cooperation.

The institute has also launched a series of “WIPO Collection of Leading Judgments on Intellectual Property Rights”. The first volume was published in collaboration with the Supreme People's Court of China in 2019 in English and Chinese. WIPO is currently working with the African Intellectual Property Organization (OAPI) and the Intellectual Property Court of the Russian Federation on the next two editions of the Collection.

The institute also oversees the WIPO Lex database, which provides open, free-of-charge access to 48,000 national, regional and international legal documents relating to intellectual property, including treaties, laws, and leading judicial decisions and judicial systems information curated by Member States. A new collection of judgments from around the world, called WIPO Lex-Judgments, was added to the database in 2020.
