= Sealed birth records =

Sealed birth records refers to the practice of sealing the original birth certificate upon adoption or legitimation, often making a copy of the record unavailable except by court order. Upon finalization of the adoption, the original birth certificate is sealed and replaced with an amended birth certificate declaring the adoptee to be the child of their adoptive parents, "as if" born to them. Many states, provinces and countries adopted this practice in the early to mid-20th century with the aim of protecting the adopted person from the shame of an illegitimate birth. Sealed or closed birth records are generally associated with closed adoption. Open records is generally referred to as the practice of opening original birth records to adult adoptees, and should not be confused with open adoption, which can occur with or without sealed records, depending on the laws of the state or province in which it is carried out.

Many nations have granted adult adoptees unrestricted access to their original birth certificates. Mike Leigh's Oscar-nominated film Secrets & Lies (1996) revolves around a British woman who accesses her original birth certificate.

== History ==
=== United States ===
While Minnesota was the first state in 1917 to seal and make court adoption records unavailable to the public, in 1935 California became the first state to seal and make an adoptee's original birth record unavailable except by court order. This act, however, also required the sealing of the original birth record of a child who was born illegitimate but who was later legitimated by affidavit or court order. Sealing birth records after an adoption or legitimation was intended to protect the child from any stigma associated with being born illegitimate. It was also intended to prevent a birth parent from interfering later with the adoptive family. After World War II, the laws in most states were changed to permanently seal adoptees' original birth certificates to all parties, including the adoptee when an adult. While Kansas and Alaska seal an adoptee's original birth certificates after an adoption, the original birth record in these two states has always been available upon request once the adoptee reaches 18 years of age. Many states and provinces of the U.S. and Canada have restored the right of adult adopted people to obtain copies of their original birth certificates, though restrictions remain in a number of states even when partial restoration has been enacted by law.

=== Canada ===
The history of sealed birth records in Canada mirrors that of the United States. It is complicated by the forced adoptions of Native American children.

== See also ==
- Adoptee rights for activism working to unseal birth records
- Record sealing for a discussion of the general practice
