= Pacific Islands Legal Information Institute =

The Pacific Islands Legal Information Institute (PacLII) collects and publishes legal materials from 20 Pacific Islands Countries on its website www.paclii.org. These countries are American Samoa, Cook Islands, Federated States of Micronesia, Fiji Islands, Kiribati, Marshall Islands, Nauru, Niue, Papua New Guinea, Pitcairn Island, Samoa, Solomon Islands, Tokelau, Tonga, Tuvalu, and Vanuatu.A mirror of the PacLII website is hosted by the Australasian Legal Information Institute (AustLII), and is the version accessed by most users outside the Pacific Islands.

The documents on the PacLII website consist mainly of primary materials such as court decisions and legislation but also include decisions of various tribunals and panels or secondary information such as court rules or bench books. There is additionally a Pacific Islands Treaty Database.

PacLII is an initiative of the University of the South Pacific School of Law with assistance from AustLII. PacLII is a signatory to the Montreal Declaration on Public Access to Law and participates in the Free Access to Law Movement, a grouping of a number of world wide organizations committed to publishing and providing access to the law for free. PacLII is based at the Emalus Campus of the USP in Port Vila, Vanuatu.

USP School of Law has its headquarters in Port Vila. Its students come from more than 12 Pacific Island countries. Most of them do not have easy access to the legal materials from across the region which they need to undertake their studies. PacLII was started by the School of Law as a means to overcoming the tyrannies of distance. It has grown to become a service to governments, legal professionals, NGOs, students, academics and members of the public and has been widely recognized as an example of excellence in promoting access to legal information.
