= CourtWeb =

U.S. legal opinion repository

In order to facilitate access to written legal opinions, some U.S. court systems provide them on CourtWeb, which, unlike PACER, does not require registration.

== Scope ==
As of August 2016, CourtWeb has records from only 30 courts, for which it uses these informal names:

- Alabama Northern Bankruptcy Court
- Alaska Bankruptcy Court
- Alaska District Court
- California Northern Bankruptcy Court
- California Northern District Court
- Connecticut District Court
- Hawaii Bankruptcy Court
- Idaho District Court AKA United_States_District_Court_for_the_District_of_Idaho
- United States District Court for the Northern District of Illinois (which CourtWeb calls the Illinois Northern District Court)
- Iowa Southern District Court
- Minnesota District Court
- Missouri Eastern District Court
- Missouri Western Bankruptcy Court
- Missouri Western District Court
- Nebraska District Court
- New Jersey Bankruptcy Court
- Ohio Northern District Court
- Pennsylvania Middle District Court
- Puerto Rico Bankruptcy Court
- Tennessee Middle Bankruptcy Court
- Texas Southern District Court
- Texas Western District (Thru 5/12) Court
- U.S. Virgin Islands District Court
- U.S.Virgin Islands Bankruptcy Court
- Utah District Court
- Vermont District Court
- Washington Eastern Bankruptcy Court
- Washington Eastern District Court
- Washington Western Bankruptcy (Thru 5/14) Court
- West Virginia Northern Bankruptcy Court
