= Legal Information Institute =

Non-profit free legal information service at Cornell Law School

Legal Information Institute (LII)
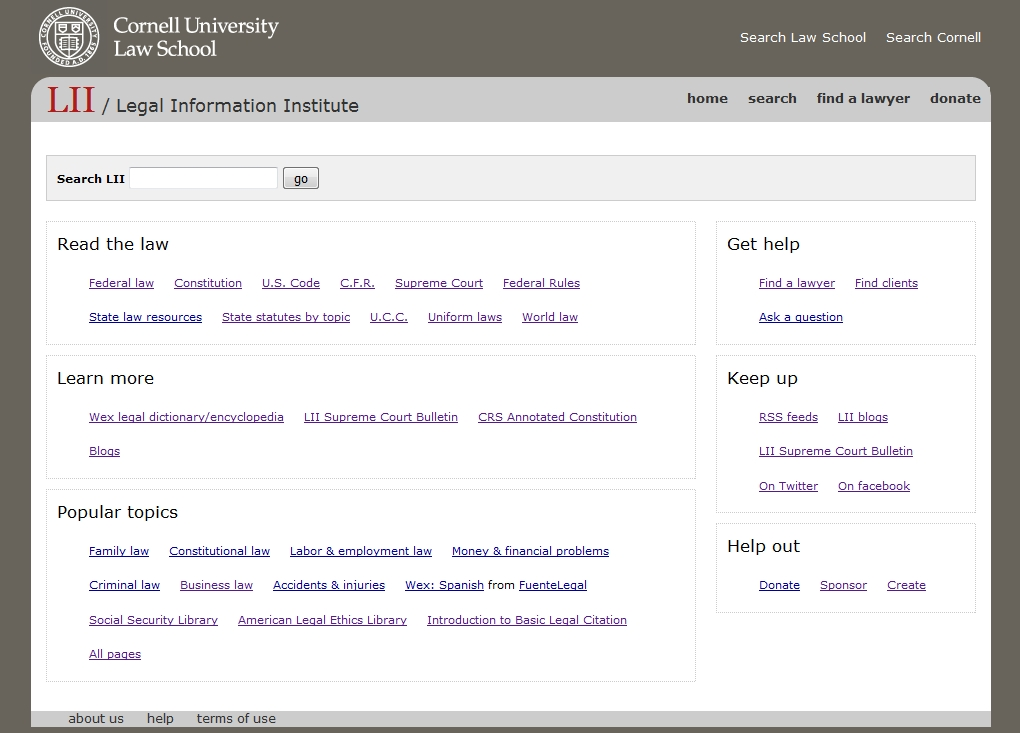
- The home page of LII on 03/03/2010
- Website type: Nonprofit, Open Access to US Law
- Available in: English, some French
- Owner: Cornell Law School
- Creators: Peter Martin and Tom Bruce
- Website: www.law.cornell.edu
- Commercial: No
- Registration: Optional
- Launched: January 1, 1992; 34 years ago
- Current status: Available

The Legal Information Institute (LII) is a non-profit public service of Cornell Law School that provides no-cost access to current American and international legal research sources online. Founded in 1992 by Peter Martin and Tom Bruce, LII was the first law site developed on the internet. LII electronically publishes on the Web the U.S. Code, U.S. Supreme Court opinions, Uniform Commercial Code, the US Code of Federal Regulations, several Federal Rules, and a variety of other American primary law materials. LII also provides access to other national and international sources, such as treaties and United Nations materials. According to its website, the LII serves over 40 million unique visitors per year.

Since its inception, the Legal Information Institute has inspired others around the world to develop namesake operations. These services are part of the Free Access to Law Movement.

== History ==
LII was established in 1992 at Cornell Law School by Peter Martin and Tom Bruce with a $250,000 multi-year startup grant from the National Center for Automated Information Research. The LII was originally based on Gopher and provided access to United States Supreme Court decisions and the US Code. Its original mission included the intent to "carry out applied research on the use of digital information technology in the distribution of legal information,...[and t]o make law more accessible." In the early years of LII, Bruce developed Cello, the first web browser for Microsoft Windows. Cello was released on 8 June 1993. In 1994 LII moved from Gopher to the Web. Since 2007 the IRS has distributed its IRS Tax Products DVD with LII's version of 26 USC (Internal Revenue Code).

== LII Supreme Court Collection and LII Bulletin ==
LII has an extensive collection of law from the Supreme Court of the United States. It hosts all Supreme Court decisions since 1990 and over 600 historic Supreme Court pre-1992 decisions in web form (by party name, by authoring justice, and by topic).

The LII Supreme Court Bulletin is LII's free Supreme Court email-based subscriber and web-based publication service. The Bulletin provides subscribers with two distinct services. The first is a notification service. LII Bulletin emails subscribers with timely notification of when the US Supreme Court has handed down a decision. It also provides subscribers links to the full opinions of those cases on the LII site.

The second service of LII Bulletin is a preview and analysis service for upcoming Supreme Court cases. Subscribers to the Bulletin receive legal analysis of upcoming Supreme Court cases with the intention of providing sophisticated yet accessible previews of the cases. LII selectively recruits second- and third-year students of the Cornell Law School to comprise the LII Bulletin editorial board. The Bulletin editorial board is responsible for every aspect of the journal's management, from selecting decisions for commentary to researching, writing, editing, and producing the journal content in HTML.

== Wex Legal Dictionary and Encyclopedia ==
LII publishes the Wex Legal Dictionary/Encyclopedia. It is a freely available legal reference, but editing is restricted. Once vetted, and subject to approval, qualified legal experts are allowed to post and edit entries on legal topics within Wex. Wex has since 2020 been continuously edited and supplemented by the Wex Definitions Team, a group of supervised Cornell Law student editors.

== Similar institutions ==
- Free Access to Law Movement unites many similar institutions, including
  - AfricanLII
  - AustLII
  - BAILII
  - CanLII
  - HKLII
  - NZLII
  - PacLII
  - SAFLII
  - WorldLII
- Free Law Project

== See also ==
- Legal awareness
