= CM/ECF =

Electronic system for US federal courts

CM/ECF logo

CM/ECF (Case Management/Electronic Case Files) is the case management and electronic court filing system for most of the United States federal courts. PACER, an acronym for Public Access to Court Electronic Records, is an interface to the same system for public use.

== History and associated applications ==
CM/ECF was first implemented in 1996 in the Northern District of Ohio to handle a large number of asbestos cases. Pilot programs were implemented in the Western District of Missouri, the Eastern District of New York and the District of Oregon in late 1997. National rollout of the system started in bankruptcy courts in 2001, 2002 in district courts, and in 2004 in appellate courts. CM/ECF is not used in state courts, but several states have moved toward implementation of comparable systems for at least some cases. As of January 2012, there were "some two hundred" courts running CM/ECF. PACER (Public Access to Court Electronic Records), the Federal Judiciary's electronic public access system, still provides access to docket entries as it did before CM/ECF; however, CM/ECF allows for access to pleadings, motion papers, briefs, and other documents filed by the parties and attorneys in the case (with the exception of any documents permitted to be filed under seal or in camera). For most documents, an access charge of $0.10 per page is levied to defray the cost of maintaining the system. In compliance with the E-Government Act of 2002, written opinions that "set forth a reasoned explanation for a court's decision" are free of charge. To facilitate online access, courts implementing CM/ECF require attorneys to file copies of most litigation papers electronically, instead of or in addition to the traditional filing of paper copies.

== Operational description ==
The main purpose of the system is to fulfill the legal obligation of the Clerk of Court as custodian of court records. Each case is assigned a number in the format D:YY-TT-SSSSS where D=Division Office (most districts are split into divisions), YY=Year, TT=Type (e.g. bk=bankruptcy, cv=civil, cr=criminal), SSSSS=Sequence number. The case number does not contain any type of court identifier.

The main list of the case is the docket sheet. The docket sheet contains a chronological list of each filing and any associated documents (in PDF format) in the case. Each record includes the filing date, docket text, and a link to filed documents. Events can link to past events. Example docket text: "Hearing Held on #18 Motion for Relief from Stay to Proceed With Foreclosure Action Against 123 Corporate Drive, Anytown, Pennsylvania. Filed by ABC Bank Represented by DEWEY CHEATEM (Counsel). ORDER ENTERED (T., Jason) (Entered: 03/01/2007)"—see this sample CM/ECF docket sheet.

== The application ==
CM/ECF is a web-based application that is written mainly in Perl and Java, which generates HTML with JavaScript for some client side validation. The software runs under Solaris or Red Hat Linux OS using Apache webserver. Most courts have moved to a Linux server. An Informix SQL database is used to store the data. In general, the software is fairly simple and easily maintained.

All documents are required to be filed in the PDF format. Other file types may be encapsulated inside PDF files, e.g. audio files in MP3 format, or video files. CM/ECF plans to require PDF/A compliant files to meet the requirements of the National Archives and Records Administration. Each court will set its own deadline for requiring documents to be filed in the PDF/A format. No warning period is planned.

Extensive changes were made in version 3.3 to use Yahoo!'s YUI library. This has increased the complexity of the version 3.2 code. The 3.3 application sports a more modern interface with drop down menus and no frame. Much of the 3.2 simple HTML user interface is still available depending on the menu items selected.

The system is decentralized with each court running its own servers and its own copy of the software. Each court has a live server and separate training and test servers. The test server is used to make changes and install new versions before "going to live." The training server allows users to learn how to use CM/ECF without affecting live cases.

While the application is developed and maintained centrally by the Administrative Office of the U.S. Courts, local staff members configure the application specifically for the local court to conform to local rules and practices. Since source code can be modified locally, there is some variability in the application between districts. Most local changes are cosmetic and do not change the core functionality of the application.

The database design centers on the case record and each case record has multiple related records. For example, the "party" table lists parties to the case—Plaintiff, Defendant, Debtor, etc. In a bankruptcy case the Trustee, US Trustee, and certain creditors can become parties to a case. Each party is either pro se or has one or more counsel (attorney) listed. A party can also have a list of aliases, e.g., "Winona Judd DBA 'The Judds'". This feature allows name searches to find the case.

== Security and privacy ==
CM/ECF was breached during the 2020 United States federal government data breach. After gaining access, the attackers deployed "Teardrop", a piece of second-stage malware that likely gave them the ability to modify or exfiltrate data.

== See also ==
- PACER, Public Access to Court Electronic Records
- Electronic System for Trademark Trials and Appeals
- California Court Case Management System
- New York State Courts Electronic Filing System
- MassCourts
- record sealing
