= Wex =

Online legal dictionary and encyclopedia

- Available in: English
- Owners: Cornell Law School; Legal Information Institute
- Website: www.law.cornell.edu/wex

Wex is a collaboratively-edited legal dictionary and encyclopaedia, intended for broad use by "practically everyone, even law students and lawyers entering new areas of law".

It is sponsored and hosted by the Legal Information Institute ("LII") at the Cornell Law School. Much of the material that appears in Wex was originally developed for the LII's "Law about..." pages, to which Wex is the successor.

Wex accepts contributions from qualified experts and takes pains to qualify them. It screens editors before allowing them to contribute.

== See also ==
- Black's Law Dictionary
- Comparative law wiki
