= WIPO Lex =

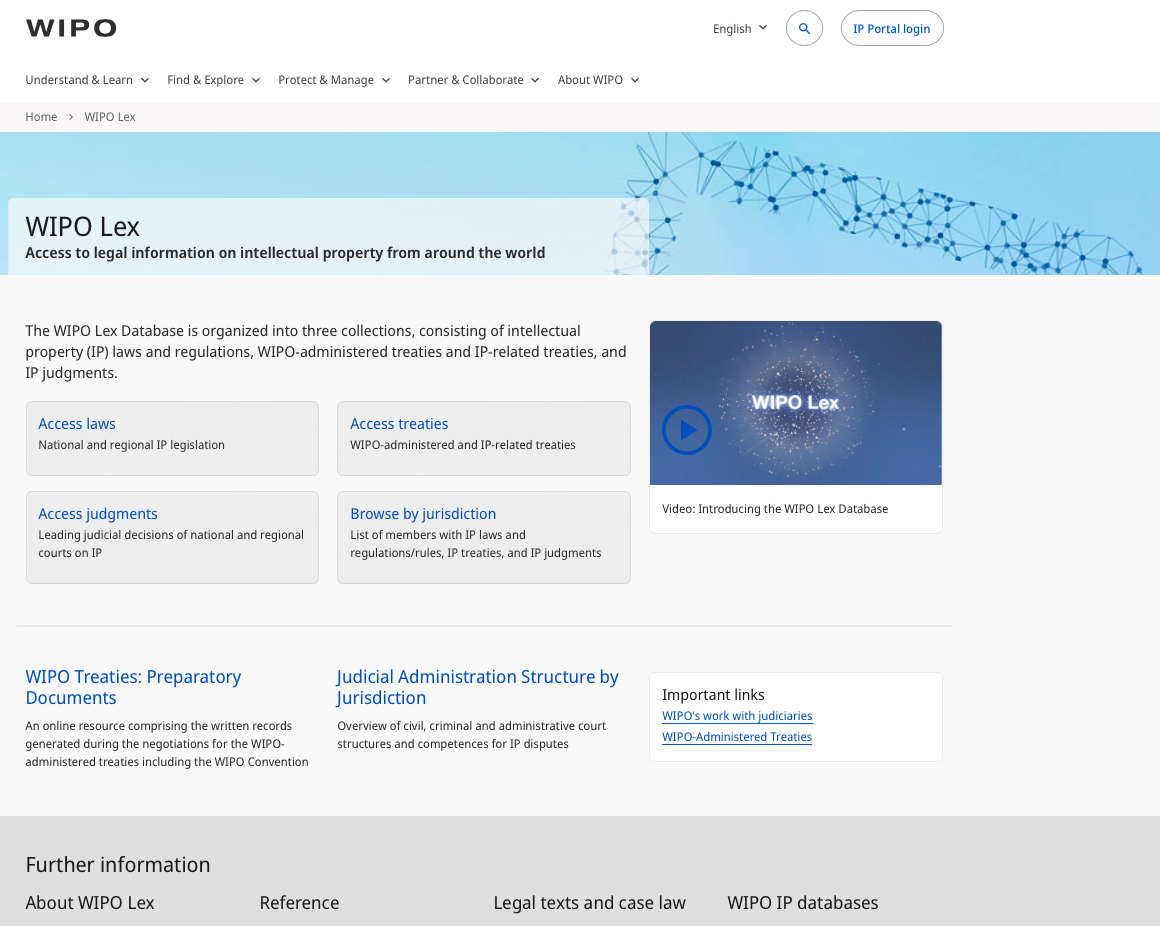
- WIPO Lex English presentation page
- Website type: Online Legal Database
- Available in: Arabic, Chinese, English, French, Russian, Spanish
- Owner: World Intellectual Property Organization
- Website: www.wipo.int/en/web/wipolex
- Commercial: No
- Registration: No registration
- Users: 1.8 million in 2015
- Launched: September 20, 2010
- Current status: Online and developing

WIPO Lex is an online global database launched in 2010, which provides free public access to intellectual property laws, treaties and judicial decisions from around the world. The World Intellectual Property Organization (WIPO) maintains and develops the database.

The objective of WIPO Lex is to provide information concerning the protection of intellectual property of WIPO Member States in accordance with Article 4(vi) of the WIPO Convention, which states that WIPO "shall assemble and disseminate information concerning the protection of intellectual property, carry out and promote studies in this field, and publish the results of such studies."

WIPO Lex contains IP legal information of UN Members, as well as World Trade Organization (WTO) Members pursuant to Article 2(4) of the Agreement between WIPO and WTO of December 22, 1995 and Article 63.2 of the Agreement on Trade-Related Aspects of Intellectual Property Rights. WIPO Lex also covers international treaties related to intellectual property. In particular, the database includes all WIPO-administered treaties.

In 2014 the database included legal acts of 196 States and cumulatively contained 13 thousand entries. In 2022, the WIPO Lex Database contained 48,000 national, regional and international legal documents relating to intellectual property, with access in the six UN languages.

The database is used as source of legal and reference information in universities and libraries all over the world.

== Collections ==
The WIPO Lex database consists of three collections: IP laws, WIPO and other IP-related treaties, and IP judgments. WIPO Lex maintains IP legal collections for approximately 200 jurisdictions. The Database is curated and updated by experts, to provide up-to-date information on evolving IP laws, policies and their interpretations.

=== Laws ===
The WIPO Lex laws collection contains legal instruments including constitutions, main IP laws and regulations, IP-related laws and IP legal literature. The legislative content covers 20 subject matter areas, including patents, copyright, trademarks, utility models, industrial designs, geographical indications, traditional knowledge, plant variety protection, trade secrets, and others.

=== Treaties ===
The WIPO Lex treaties collection consists of both WIPO-administered treaties and related regulations and administrative documents, as well as other multilateral and regional IP treaties.

=== Judgements ===
The WIPO Lex judgments collection (WIPO Judicial Institute) was added in 2020, and consists of leading judicial decisions on IP, organized by jurisdiction, subject matter, issuing authority, and type of procedure. By the end of 2024, this collection reported that it held 1,700 court decisions representing 46 jurisdictions.

WIPO Lex supports other IP legal databases, including UPOV Lex, and collections of laws concerning traditional knowledge, trademarks, and industrial designs.

In 2024, as part of its strategy on Standard Essential Patents (SEP), WIPO created a new collection of laws on WIPO Lex that brings together patents protecting inventions that are essential to the implementation of a standard relating to a specific technology.

== Features ==
The WIPO Lex database is organized by member profile, and is also searchable by collection, subject matter, and free-text queries. It provides individual bibliographic pages for each entry in the database.

For the laws collection, the bibliographic entry displays information such as the dates types (adoption and entry into force, etc.), the type of text, subject matters and relations among the legislation. In some instances, legal notes published in the bibliographic entries are provided for additional information. Other features include additional language versions, links to related legislation and treaties, and archived superseded records of the law or regulation in question. In many instances, individual documents are bookmarked to assist users in identifying relevant provisions within the legislative text.

A bibliographic entry in the treaties collection provides information on the host institution/depositary, contracting parties/signatories, subject matters, and available language versions of the treaty. In some instances, the bibliographic notes field provides additional information, such as identifying the relevant IP provisions within the text.

== See also ==
- Computer-assisted legal research
- Intellectual Property Watch
