= Lilian Edwards =

- Known for: Internet law, intellectual property and artificial intelligence
- Board member of: Advisory Board of the Open Rights Group; Foundation for Information Policy Research
- Awards: Barbara Wellberry Memorial Prize (2004)

Academic work
- Institutions: Newcastle University; University of Strathclyde; University of Edinburgh; University of Southampton; University of Sheffield

Lilian Edwards is a Scottish UK-based academic and frequent speaker on issues of Internet law, intellectual property and artificial intelligence. She is on the Advisory Board of the Open Rights Group and the Foundation for Information Policy Research and is the Professor of Law, Innovation and Society at Newcastle Law School at Newcastle University.

== Academic career ==
Edwards is a leading academic in the field of Internet law. She has taught information technology law, e-commerce law, privacy law and Internet law at undergraduate and postgraduate level since 1996 and been involved with law and artificial intelligence (AI) since 1985.

She worked at the University of Strathclyde from 1986 to 1988 and the University of Edinburgh from 1989 to 2006. She became Chair of Internet Law at the University of Southampton from 2006 to 2008, and then Professor of Internet Law at the University of Sheffield until late 2010, when she returned to Scotland to become Professor of E-Governance at the University of Strathclyde, while retaining close links with the renamed SCRIPT (AHRC Centre) at the University of Edinburgh. She resigned from that role in 2018 to take up a new Chair in Law, Innovation and Society at Newcastle University. She is part seconded for 2021-2022 to the Ada Lovelace Institute to lead their work on the proposed EU AI Regulation.

She has co-edited (both with Charlotte Waelde and alone) four editions of a textbook, Law and the Internet (later Law, Policy and the Internet); the fourth edition appeared in 2018. She won the Barbara Wellberry Memorial Prize in 2004 for work on online privacy and data trusts. A collection of her essays, The New Legal Framework for E-Commerce in Europe, was published in 2005. She is Associate Director, and was co-founder, of the Arts and Humanities Research Council (AHRC) Centre for IP and Technology Law (now SCRIPT). Edwards has consulted for the EU Commission, the OECD, and WIPO.

Edwards co-chairs GikII, an annual series of international workshops on the intersections between law, technology and popular culture.

Edwards' previous roles include Deputy Director of CREATe, the Centre for Creativity, Regulation, Enterprise and Technology, a Research Councils UK research centre about copyright and business models.

== Other interests ==
Edwards was an active science fiction fan during the 1980s and 1990s, and won the TransAtlantic Fan Fund in 1988 on a joint platform with her friend Christina Lake; they had previously co-edited the fanzine This Never Happens.
