= AfricanLII =

AfricanLII or the African Legal Information Institute is a project to support the establishment and operation of independent national Legal Information Institute projects in Africa. AfricanLII is a project of the Democratic Governance and Rights Unit, Department of Public Law, University of Cape Town. AfricanLII was incubated at the Southern Africa Litigation Center (SALC) from October 2010 to March 2013.

Since 2012, AfricanLII has been member of the Free Access to Law Movement.

== See also ==
- Jurispedia
