= PACER (law) =

Electronic document system for U.S. federal courts

- Creator: Administrative Office of the United States Courts
- Website: www.pacer.uscourts.gov
- Commercial: No

PACER (acronym for Public Access to Court Electronic Records) is an electronic public access service for United States federal court documents. It allows authorized users to obtain case and docket information from the United States district courts, United States courts of appeals, and United States bankruptcy courts. The system is managed by the Administrative Office of the United States Courts in accordance with the policies of the Judicial Conference, headed by the Chief Justice of the United States. As of 2013, it holds more than 500 million documents.

Each court maintains its own system, with a small subset of information from each case transferred to the U.S. Party/Case Index server, located in San Antonio, Texas at the PACER Service Center, each night. Records are submitted to the individual courts using the Federal Judiciary's Case Management/Electronic Case Files (CM/ECF) system, usually as Portable Document Format (PDF) formatted files using the courts' electronic court filing (e-filing) system. Each court maintains its own databases with case information. Because PACER database systems are maintained within each court, each jurisdiction has a different URL.

PACER has been criticized for being technically out of date and hard to use, and for demanding fees for records that are in the public domain. A number of legal challenges have been mounted against the dollar amount of PACER fees and the utilization of those fees by the federal judiciary, and legislation to reform PACER fees has been proposed. In reaction to these fees, nonprofit projects have begun to make such documents available online for free.

== Available information ==
The PACER System offers electronic access to case dockets to retrieve information such as:

- A listing of all parties and participants including judges, attorneys, and trustees
- A compilation of case related information such as cause of action, case number, nature of suit, and dollar demand
- A chronology of dates of case events entered in the case record
- A claims registry
- A listing of new cases each day
- Appellate court opinions
- Judgments or case status
- Types of documents filed for certain cases
- Many courts offer imaged copies of documents

== Acceptable use of information ==
The information gathered from the PACER system is a matter of public record and may be reproduced without permission.

== History ==
PACER started in 1988 as a system accessible only by terminals in libraries and office buildings. Starting in 2001, PACER was made available over the Web.

== Fees ==
The United States Congress has given the Judicial Conference of the United States authority to impose user fees for electronic access to case information. All registered agencies or individuals are charged a user fee.

The fee, as of April 1, 2012, to access the web-based PACER systems is $0.10 per page. Prior to that the fee was $0.08 per page and prior to January 1, 2005, the fee was $0.07 per page. The per page charge applies to the number of pages that results from any search, including a search that yields no matches with a one-page charge for no matches. The charge applies whether or not pages are printed, viewed, or downloaded. There is a maximum charge of $3.00 for electronic access to any single document other than name searches, reports that are not case-specific, and transcripts of federal court proceedings.

In March 2001, the Judicial Conference of the United States decided that no fee would be owed until a user accrued more than $10 worth of charges in a calendar year. If an account does not accrue $10 worth of usage between January 1 and December 31 of a year, the amount owed would be zeroed. In March 2010, that limit was effectively quadrupled, with users not billed unless their charges exceed $10 in a quarterly billing period. Beginning in 2012, the limit was $15 per quarter. In September 2019 the limit was doubled to $30 per quarter amid claims they were collecting excessive fees.

Effective with Version 2.4 (March 7, 2005) of the PACER software, to comply with the E-Government Act of 2002, written opinions that "set forth a reasoned explanation for a court's decision" are supposed to be free of charge, but are sometimes billed for. In order to facilitate access to written opinions, the court system also provides them on CourtWeb, which does not require PACER registration but only has records from (as of Aug 2016) 30 courts.

=== Revenues ===
Fee revenues is used by the courts to finance technology. The New York Times reported PACER revenues exceeded costs by about $150 million, as of 2008 according to court reports.

=== Fee exemption ===
According to the Electronic Public Access Fee Schedule adopted by the Judicial Conference on 13 September 2011:

Consistent with Judicial Conference policy, courts may, upon a showing of cause, exempt indigents, bankruptcy case trustees, individual researchers associated with educational institutions, courts, section 501(c)(3) not-for-profit organizations, court appointed pro bono attorneys, and pro bono ADR neutrals from payment of these fees. Courts must find that parties from the classes of persons or entities listed above seeking exemption have demonstrated that an exemption is necessary in order to avoid unreasonable burdens and to promote public access to information. For individual researchers, courts must also find that the defined research project is intended for academic research, and not for commercial purposes or internet redistribution. Any user granted an exemption agrees not to sell for profit the data obtained as a result. Any transfer of data obtained as the result of a fee exemption is prohibited unless expressly authorized by the court. Exemptions may be granted for a definite period of time and may be revoked at the discretion of the court granting the exemption.

A "policy note" attached to the Electronic Public Access Fee Schedule states:

Courts should not exempt local, state or federal government agencies, members of the media, attorneys or others not members of one of the groups listed above. Exemptions should be granted as the exception, not the rule. A court may not use this exemption language to exempt all users. An exemption applies only to access related to the case or purpose for which it was given. The prohibition on transfer of information received without fee is not intended to bar a quote or reference to information received as a result of a fee exemption in a scholarly or other similar work.

Fees are not charged against federal agencies providing services authorized by the Criminal Justice Act (18 U.S.C. § 3006A).

=== RECAP (free alternative) ===
In 2009, a team from Princeton University and Harvard University's Berkman Center created software called "RECAP" which allows users to automatically search for free copies during a PACER search, and to help building up a free alternative database at the Internet Archive.

Some courts such as the District Court for the District of Massachusetts have explicitly stated that "fee exempt PACER users must refrain from the use of RECAP". In 2009, the Los Angeles Times stated that RECAP cuts into PACER revenue about $10 million.

RECAP is now maintained by the Free Law Project which continues to advocate for more open access to court records.

=== Litigation over fees ===
In December 2015, Bryndon Fisher, a Seattle resident, filed a class-action lawsuit in the U.S. Court of Federal Claims against the Administrative Office of the United States Courts, alleging that PACER overcharges its subscribers by billing by the number of bytes generated instead of by page count, and by overcounting the number of bytes. In December 2022, the Court entered an opinion denying Fisher's motion to certify the class because he "failed to satisfy the predominance and superiority requirements of RCFC 23(b)." Fisher's subsequent request for an interlocutory appeal was also unsuccessful.

In April 2016, three non-profit organizations—the Alliance for Justice, the National Veterans Legal Services Program and the National Consumer Law Center—filed another class-action lawsuit, in the U.S. District Court for the District of Columbia, against the Administrative Office, alleging that the PACER fee structure did not conform to the E-Government Act of 2002, in that the fees were not only being used to maintain the system itself, but were being diverted to cover other costs of the federal courts, including courtroom audio systems and flat-screen televisions for jury use. In January 2017, judge Ellen Huvelle certified the class action. In March 2018, the judge ruled that the PACER fees were impermissibly used to cover unrelated costs; In August 2020, the Court of Appeals for the Federal Circuit affirmed the district court's judgment, remanding the case to the district court to continue with the case. On March 20, 2024, Judge Paul L. Friedman approved a settlement to refund $100 million to users who used the system during the time PACER fees were improperly allocated, and pay $25 million for attorneys' fees and administration of the settlement.

In November 2016, another putative class action relating to PACER was filed in the United States District Court for the Southern District of Florida. The plaintiff there claims that PACER fails to provide its users with free access to "judicial opinions," in violation of PACER's contracts with its users as well as the E-Government Act of 2002. In September 2017, District Court Judge Robert N. Scola, Jr. dismissed the case; the Court of Appeals for the Federal Circuit affirmed the dismissal on June 15, 2020.

=== Proposed fees reform legislation ===
PACER reform proposals have been introduced in Congress since the 115th Congress. The 117th Congress saw the introduction of the Open Courts Act of 2021 (H.R. 5844/S. 2614), which would temporarily increase fees for entities who currently spend more than $25,000 a quarter on download fees in order to fund a transition to a system with free downloads. A Congressional Budget Office report estimated that the new system would cost about one-fifth the cost of PACER to operate, but their estimate for the total cost of setting up the system surprised at least one of the bill's sponsors. Previous unenacted bills include the Electronic Court Records Reform Act of 2018 (H.R. 6714), introduced in the 115th Congress, and the Electronic Court Records Reform Act of 2019 (H.R. 1164/S. 2064) in the 116th Congress.

== Reception ==
The New York Times has criticized PACER as "cumbersome, arcane and not free." In 2008, an effort led by Carl Malamud (who said that PACER is "15 to 20 years out of date" and that it should not demand fees for documents that are in the public domain) spent $600,000 in contributions to put a 50-year archive of records from the federal courts of appeals online for free. In a critical article, the magazine Reason described the system as "archaic as a barrister's wig."

Also in 2008, district courts, with the help of the Government Printing Office (GPO), opened a free trial of Pacer at 17 libraries around the country. After activist Aaron Swartz, following an appeal by Malamud, downloaded about 2.7 million documents through a Sacramento library computer (less than 1% of the entire database, although the number has been stated incorrectly as 20% or 25%), to make them freely available to the public on Public.Resource.Org, the experiment was ended in late September 2008, with a notice from the GPO that the pilot program was suspended, "pending an evaluation." In October, a GPO representative said that "the security of the Pacer service was compromised." A FOIA request revealed later that the FBI had opened a full investigation against Swartz, which was dropped in April.

== See also ==
- Case Management/Electronic Case Files (CM/ECF)
- California Court Case Management System (CCMS)
- New York State Courts Electronic Filing System (NYSCEF)
- MassCourts
- RECAP
- CaseMap
- RECAP US Federal Court Documents (collection)
- Record sealing
