= Peter W. Martin =

American Law Professor

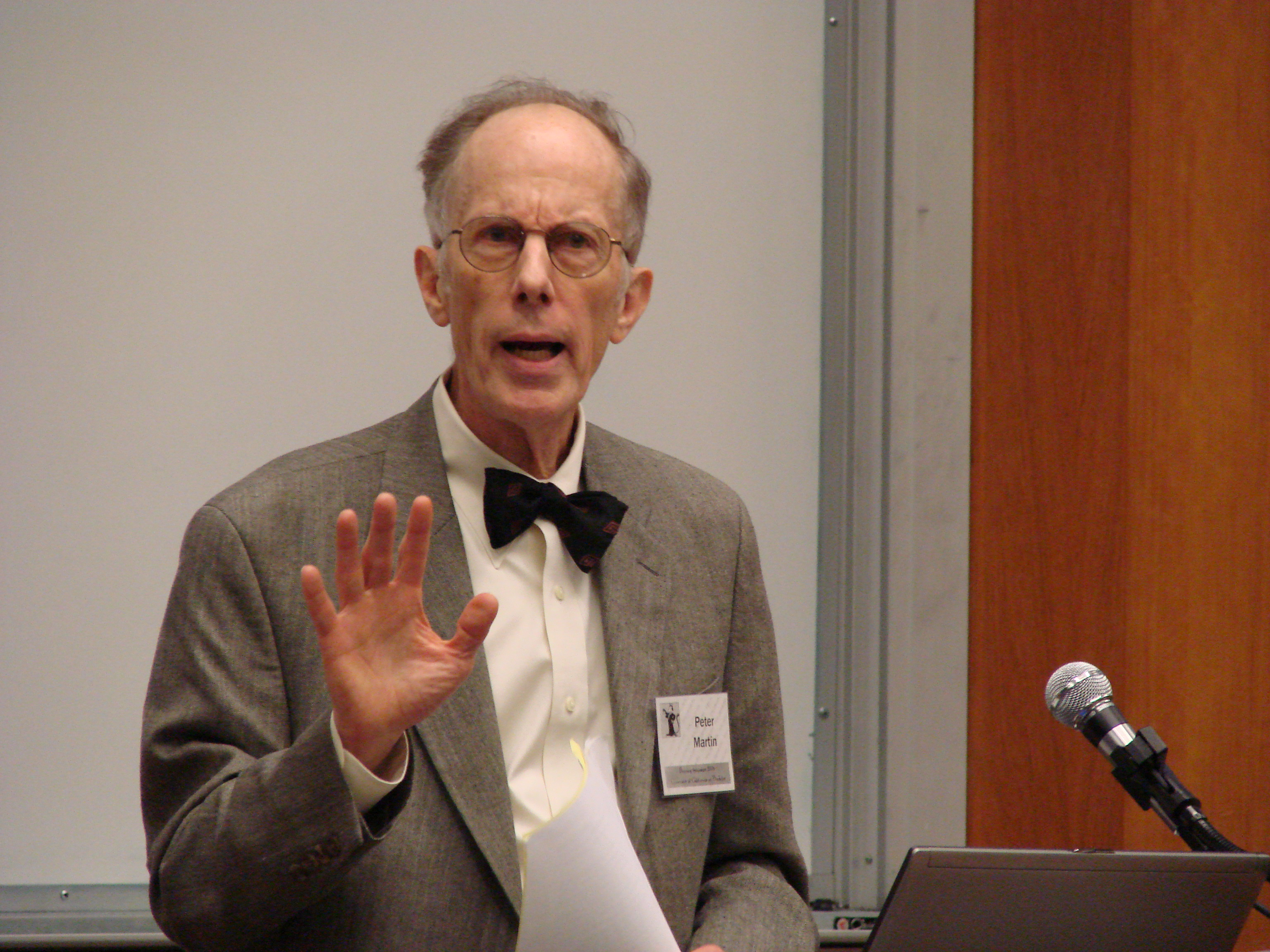
Peter W. Martin, 2006

Peter W. Martin has been a law professor since 1972, and Dean from 1980 to 1988, at Cornell Law School. In 1992, together with Thomas R. Bruce, he co-founded the Legal Information Institute at Cornell Law. He graduated from Cornell University and Harvard Law School.
