= Henry Campbell Black =

American legal lexicographer (1860–1927)

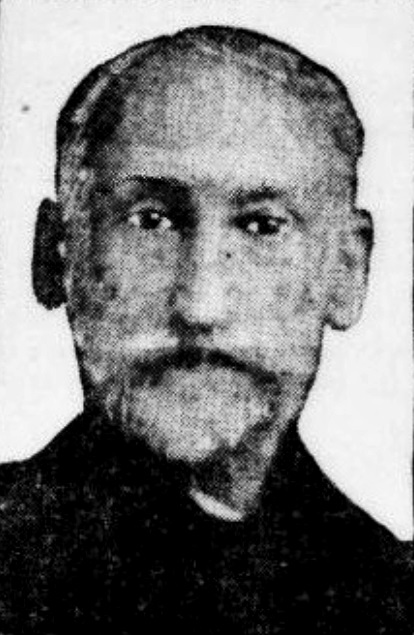
- Born: October 17, 1860; Ossining, New York, US
- Died: March 19, 1927 (aged 66); Washington, D.C., US

Academic background
- Education: Trinity College (BA, MA, LLD)

Academic work
- Discipline: law
- Notable works: Black's Law Dictionary

Henry Campbell Black (October 17, 1860 – March 19, 1927) was the founder of Black's Law Dictionary, the definitive legal dictionary in the US first published in 1891.

Born in Ossining, New York, Black studied at Trinity College in Hartford, Connecticut, receiving a bachelor’s degree in 1880, a Master of Arts degree in 1887, and a Doctor of Laws (LLD) degree in 1916. He was also the editor of The Constitutional Review from 1917 until his death in 1927.

== Books ==
- Black, Henry Campbell (1895). Handbook of American Constitutional Law. West.
- Black, Henry Campbell (1891). A Dictionary of Law: Containing Definitions of the Terms and Phrases of American and English Jurisprudence, Ancient and Modern : Including the Principal Terms of International, Constitutional, and Commercial Law : with a Collection of Legal Maxims and Numerous Select Titles from the Civil Law and Other Foreign Systems. The Lawbook Exchange, Ltd. (1991 reprint ISBN 978-0-9630106-0-5)
  - 1910 edition free e-book Black, Henry Campbell (1910). A Law Dictionary: Containing Definitions of the Terms and Phrases of American and English Jurisprudence, Ancient and Modern : and Including the Principal Terms of International, Constitutional, Ecclesiastical and Commercial Law, and Medical Jurisprudence, with a Collection of Legal Maxims, Numerous Select Titles from the Roman, Modern Civil, Scotch, French, Spanish, and Mexican Law, and Other Foreign Systems, and a Table of Abbreviations. West Publishing Company.
- Black, Henry Campbell (1891). A Treatise on the Law of Judgments, Including the Doctrine of Res Judicata. West Publishing.

== Sources ==
- Who Was Who in America. A component volume of Who's Who in American History, Volume 1, 1897-1942 (Chicago: A.N. Marquis Co., 1943), page 100
