= Black's Law Dictionary =

Popular American law dictionary

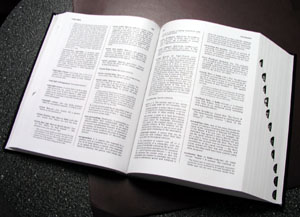
- Image of the 7th edition
- Editor: Bryan A. Garner (1999–present)
- Language: English
- Publisher: West (Thomson Reuters)
- Publication date: 1891 (1st); 1910 (2nd); 1933 (3rd); 1951 (4th); 1968 (4thR); 1979 (5th); 1990 (6th); 1999 (7th); 2004 (8th); 2009 (9th); 2014 (10th); 2019 (11th); 2024 (12th)
- Publication place: United States
- ISBN: 978-1-5392-2975-9
- Website: Black's Law Dictionary

Black's Law Dictionary is the most frequently used legal dictionary in the United States. Henry Campbell Black (1860–1927) was the author of the first two editions of the dictionary.

== History ==
The first edition was published in 1891 by West Publishing, with the full title A Dictionary of Law: containing definitions of the terms and phrases of American and English jurisprudence, ancient and modern, including the principal terms of international constitutional and commercial law, with a collection of legal maxims and numerous select titles from the civil law and other foreign systems. A second edition was published in 1910 as A Law Dictionary. Black died in 1927 and future editions were titled Black's Law Dictionary.

The sixth and earlier editions of the book also provided case citations for each legal term, which lawyers regarded as the book’s most useful feature, offering a valuable starting point with leading cases. The development of the Internet made legal research easier therefore many state- or circuit-specific case citations and outdated or overruled case citations were omitted from the seventh edition in 1999. The eighth edition introduced a unique system of perpetually updated case citations and cross-references to legal encyclopedias. The current edition is the twelfth, published in 2024.

As many legal terms are derived from a Latin root word, the dictionary provides a pronunciation guide for such terms. In addition, the applicable entries provide pronunciation transcriptions pursuant to those found among North American practitioners of law.

== Availability ==
An online version of the tenth edition can be accessed through the paid Westlaw legal information service, and is available as an application for iOS devices.

The second edition of Black's Law Dictionary, published in 1910, is now in the public domain and is widely reproduced online. References to case law are out-of-date, and that edition of the dictionary omits legal terms that have since come into use and does not reflect contemporary changes in how legal terms are used.

== Bibliography ==
- Black's Law Dictionary 12th ed. (West Group, 2024), Bryan A. Garner, editor, ISBN 979-8-35029089-9
- Black's Law Dictionary 11th ed. (West Group, 2019), Bryan A. Garner, editor, ISBN 978-1-5392-2975-9
- Black's Law Dictionary 10th ed. (West Group, 2014), Bryan A. Garner, editor, ISBN 978-0-314-61300-4
- Black's Law Dictionary 9th ed. (West Group, 2009), Bryan A. Garner, editor, ISBN 0-314-19949-7
- Black's Law Dictionary 8th ed. (West Group, 2004), Bryan A. Garner, editor, ISBN 0-314-15199-0
- Black's Law Dictionary 7th ed. (West Group, 1999), Bryan A. Garner, editor, ISBN 0-314-22864-0
- Black's Law Dictionary 6th ed. (West Publishing, 1990) ISBN 90-6544-631-1
- Black's Law Dictionary 5th ed. (West Publishing, 1979) ISBN 0-8299-2041-2
- Black's Law Dictionary Revised 4th ed. (St. Paul: West, 1968)
- Black's Law Dictionary 4th ed. (St. Paul: West, 1951)
- Black's Law Dictionary 3rd ed. (West Publishing Co., 1933) (the first edition after Henry C. Black's death)
- A Law Dictionary 2nd ed. (St. Paul, Minn.: West Publishing, 1910) ISBN 1-886363-10-2. Public domain (accessible for free through Google Books)
- A Dictionary of Law 1st ed. (St. Paul, Minn.: West Publishing, 1891) ISBN 0-9630106-0-3

=== Pocket editions ===
- Black's Law Dictionary 6th pocket ed. (West Group, 2021), Bryan A. Garner, editor, ISBN 9781731931610
- Black's Law Dictionary 5th pocket ed. (West Group, 2016), Bryan A. Garner, editor, ISBN 0-314-84489-9
- Black's Law Dictionary 4th pocket ed. (West Group, 2011), Bryan A. Garner, editor, ISBN 0-314-27544-4
- Black's Law Dictionary 3rd pocket ed. (West Group, 2006), Bryan A. Garner, editor, ISBN 0-314-15862-6
- Black's Law Dictionary 2nd pocket ed. (West Group, 2001), Bryan A. Garner, editor, ISBN 0-314-25791-8
- Black's Law Dictionary 1st pocket ed. (West Group, 1996), Bryan A. Garner, editor, ISBN 0-314-06690-X

=== Non-English editions ===
- Blackův právnický slovník. Complete translation of 6th edition into Czech. Victoria Publishing, Prague, 1993. ISBN 80-85605-23-6.
- Āqāʼī, Bahman. Farhang-i ḥuqūqī-i Bahman: Ingilīsī-Fārsī: bar asās-i Black's law dictionary (1999) (in Fārsī)
- Muqtadirah-yi Qaumī Zabān. Qānūnī, Angrezī-Urdu lug̲h̲at: Blaiks lāʼ dikshanarī se māk̲h̲ūz (Based on Black's law dictionary) / nigrān, Fatiḥ Muḥammad Malik (2002) ISBN 969-474-084-3. (in Urdu)

== See also ==
- Bouvier's Law Dictionary
- Legal terminology textbook
- List of legal abbreviations
- Wex
