= Can Tho University =

University in Can Tho, Vietnam

Coordinates: 10.0323°N 105.7682°E

- Đại học Cần Thơ
- Established: 1966
- President: Hà Thanh Toàn
- Vice-president: Trần Trung Tính; Trần Ngọc Hải; Nguyễn Hiếu Trung
- Faculty: 15
- Location: Can Tho, Vietnam
- Website: www.ctu.edu.vn
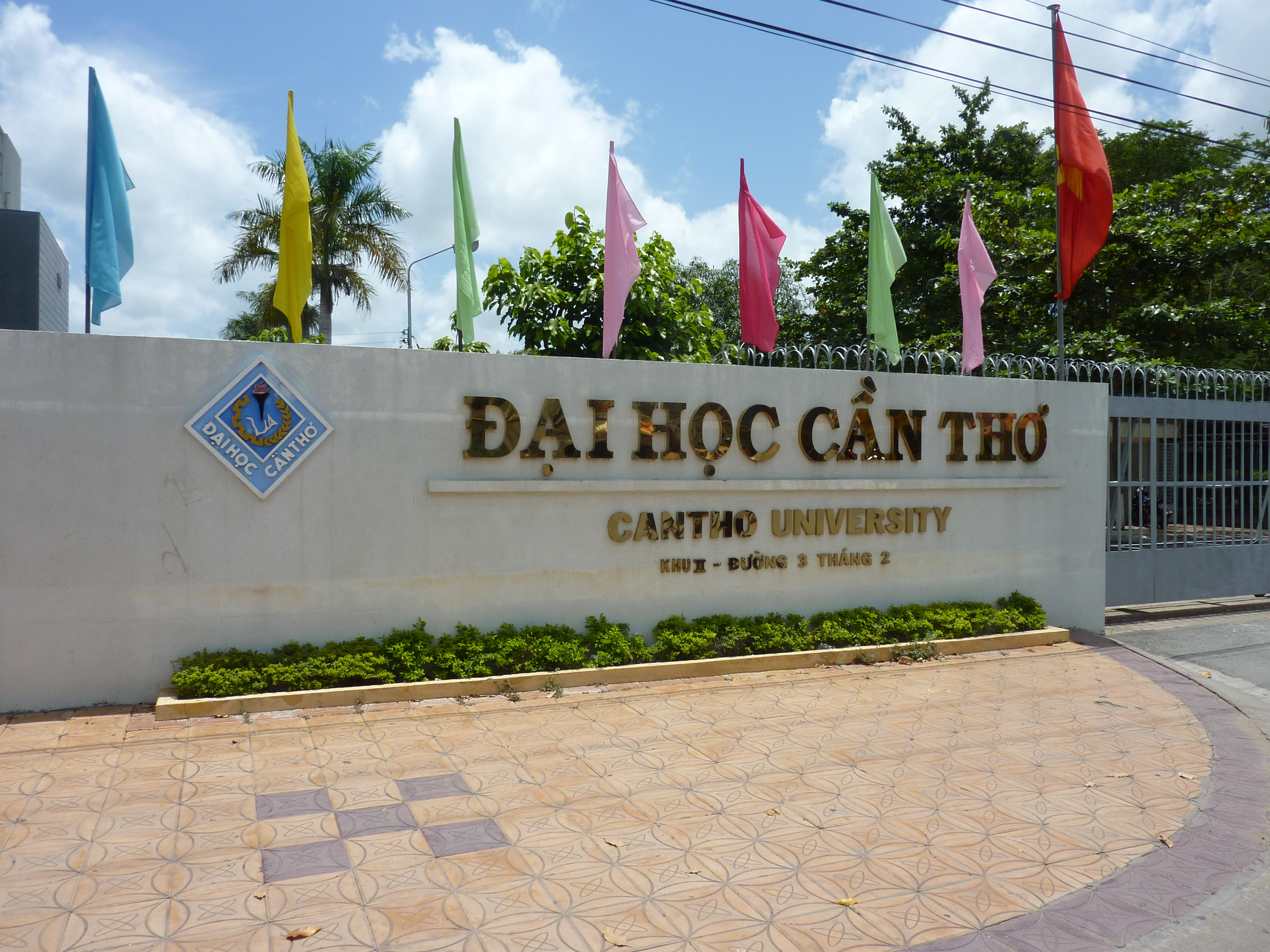

Can Tho University (Vietnamese: Đại học Cần Thơ) is a public research university in Can Tho, Vietnam. Established in 1966, it is a multidisciplinary university and a leading university in the Mekong Delta. Can Tho University is a leading agricultural research center in Vietnam. Can Tho University has nine colleges and three research institutes. Its goal is to be one of the leading higher education institutions in Vietnam and to be recognised as one of the top universities in the Asia-Pacific region in training and research by 2022.

== Description ==
At present, the total number of CTU staff is around 2,000, including 1,203 lecturers (233 PhDs and 653 Masters, constituting to 73.6% of staff members with postgraduate degrees). The current training capacity of CTU is more than 45,000 students involving full-time undergraduate and postgraduate students, part-time as well as distance-learning ones. CTU possesses approximately 100 training programs and branches of undergraduate including two advanced training programs in English, 45 Master training programs (in which one program is a joint-ventured training field with foreign partners and three programs are taught in English) and 16 PhD ones, together with two training programs of junior college.

Up to now, Can Tho University (CTU) has 17 units for academic training (eight colleges, seven schools, one high school, one unit for academic training) and several other support departments.

== Colleges ==
This is a list of colleges the university has:

- College of Agriculture
- College of Aquaculture and Fisheries
- College of Economics
- College of Engineering
- College of Environment and Natural Resources
- College of ICT
- College of Rural Development
- College of Natural Sciences

== Schools ==
- School of Education
- School of Foreign Languages
- School of Graduate
- School of Pre-University
- School of Political Science
- School of Social Sciences and Humanities
- School of Law

== High school and academic training ==
- High school Teacher Practice
- Department of Physical Education

== Centers and institutes ==
=== Centers ===
- Cantho University Software Center (CUSC)
  - Academic Department
  - Software Department
  - Plan and Business Department
- Center for Foreign Languages
  - Academic Department
  - Administration Department
  - Offices located in Campuses 1, 2, 3 and a contact staff in Campus 4 (Hoa An)
- Cooperative Training Center
- Center of National Defense Education

=== Institutes ===
- Biotechnology Research and Development Institute
- Mekong Delta Development Research Institute
- Research Institute for Climate Change
