= AltLaw =

AltLaw was an American academic project from 2007 to 2010 aimed at making federal appellate and Supreme Court case law publicly available, "to make the common law a bit more common." The project was a collaboration between Columbia Law School's Program on Law and Technology and University of Colorado School of Law's Silicon Flatirons program.

After Google Scholar added legal case documents to its collection in November 2009, the project announced that its mission was achieved, and it shut down permanently on May 3, 2010.

When AltLaw was launched, digital access to US case law was dominated by LexisNexis and Westlaw, charges for access to which can run in the hundreds of dollars per hour.

The data in AltLaw contained roughly 716,000 cases decided between 1950 and 2007, made available on US Circuit Appeals and Supreme courts web sites, all linked to from uscourts.gov, and collected by Prof. Paul K. Ohm at University of Colorado Law School and by Public.Resource.Org.
