= Internet 1996 World Exposition =

World expo held on the internet

The Internet 1996 World Exposition was a world exposition held on the internet, with a central site linked to country pavilions around the world. It was the first "World's Fair" not to be held in a single city or a specific geographic location. Corporations, organizations and individuals use the expo to showcase themselves, using the medium as the main theme. The expo was organized by the Washington-based non profit organization Internet Multicasting Service with Carl Malamud as the organization's president.

The expo ran from January 1, 1996, through the end of 1996. The countries that participated in the expo were Japan, the Netherlands, Peru, Singapore, South Korea, Sweden, Taiwan, the United Kingdom and the United States. Governments and industries have spent about US$100 million in this expo project. The opening event of the expo was held at Washington D.C. on February 8, 1996.

Sponsors provided in-kind contributions that included the first DS3 over the Pacific Ocean and two terabytes of disk drives.

Throughout the year, a variety of events brought the fair into the real world. One of Singapore's offerings were multilingual web – a collection of websites in languages other than English and the promotion of various year-round events and festivals in Singapore provided by the steering committee of the Singapore pavilion. Japan set up banners and parties in the Harajuku district of Tokyo, Taiwan opened public computers in 100 locations, and the Netherlands brought the fair to street festivals. At the end of the year, a closing ceremony was held in Tokyo, where the fair archives were archived to CD-ROM, blessed by a Shinto priest, and put in a time capsule.

Other events include 24 Hours in Cyberspace, a 24-hour photography competition which became the featured event in the expo, projects such as Global Schoolhouse Pavilion and American Folklife Festival, and pavilions such as the Future of Media, Small Business, and Reinventing Government.
