= Free Law Project =

Free legal research tools and database

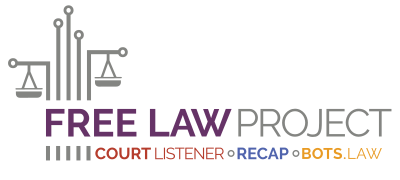
- Free Law Project Logo
- Abbreviation: FLP
- Formation: 2013-09-24
- Founders: Michael Lissner, Brian Carver
- Founded at: Emeryville, California
- Type: 501(c)(3)
- Tax ID no.: 46-3342480
- Registration no.: C3594588
- Legal status: Charity
- Headquarters: Oakland, California
- Services: CourtListener, RECAP, Bots.law
- Executive Director: Michael Lissner
- Board of directors: Michael Lissner, Brian Carver, Ansel Halliburton
- Website: free.law

Free Law Project is a 501(c)(3) nonprofit organization based in Oakland, California, United States. It provides free access to primary legal materials, develops legal research tools, and supports academic research on legal corpora. Free Law Project was founded in 2013 by Michael Lissner and Brian Carver.

Free Law Project has several initiatives that collect and share legal information, including the largest collection of American oral argument audio, daily collection of new legal opinions from 200 United States courts and administrative bodies, the RECAP Project, which collects documents from PACER, and user-generated Supreme Court citation visualizations. In September 2021, the organization's database helped The Wall Street Journal expose 138 cases of conflict of interest cases regarding violations by federal judges.

== Services ==
Free Law Project has a number of initiatives, including:

- CourtListener.com, which provides a searchable and API-accessible website with court dockets, 900,000 minutes of oral argument recordings, more than eight thousand judges, and more than three million opinions. All of the opinions on Court Listener are searchable using both keywords and semantic search, are interlinked by a citator, and the graph of citations is available via an API.
- RECAP Project, which allows users to automatically search for free copies of documents during a search in the fee-based online US legal database PACER, creating a free alternative database at the Internet Archive and Court Listener.
- Judge and Appointer Database, which provides biographical and electoral information about more than 16,000 American judges and appointors.
- Database of Reporters, which provides information about more than 400 legal reporters.
- Courts-DB, which provides information about more than 700 US courts. All of Free Law Project's work is open source and available online.

=== RECAP ===
RECAP is software which allows users to automatically search for free copies of documents during a search in the fee-based online U.S. federal court document database PACER (Public Access to Court Electronic Records), and to help build up a free alternative database. It was created in 2009 by a team from Princeton University's Center for Information Technology Policy and Harvard University's Berkman Center. It is now maintained as part of the Free Law Project. The name "RECAP" derives from "PACER", spelled backward.

RECAP is available as a Mozilla Firefox add-on, Google Chrome extension, and Safari extension. For each PACER document, the software will first check if it has already been uploaded by another user. If no free version exists and the user purchases the document from PACER, it will automatically upload a copy to the RECAP server, thereby building the database. PACER continued charging per page fees after the introduction of RECAP.

Prior to the creation of RECAP, activist Aaron Swartz set up an automatic download from an official library entry point to PACER. Swartz downloaded 2.7 million documents, all public domain, representing less than 1 percent of the documents in PACER. These public domain documents were later uploaded to RECAP and made available to the public for free. However, the automated downloading triggered a government investigation. No criminal charges were filed because PACER had provided lawful access, the documents copied were in the public domain, and the case was closed.

Some courts have acknowledged RECAP's free distribution of documents. A small handful of PACER users receive fee-exempt access (fee waivers are granted on a district-by-district basis), and a condition of the fee waiver generally requires that fee exempt users not further distribute documents they receive under the waiver, pursuant to Judicial Conference policy. The United States District Court for the District of Massachusetts displays a prominent reminder on its ECF page, saying that "fee exempt PACER users must refrain from the use of RECAP".

=== CourtListener ===
CourtListener is an open source software project on GitHub to archive and host court documents.

== See also ==
- Free Access to Law Movement
- Public.Resource.Org § Access to United States legal resources
