= Court clerk =

Legal officer, administrator

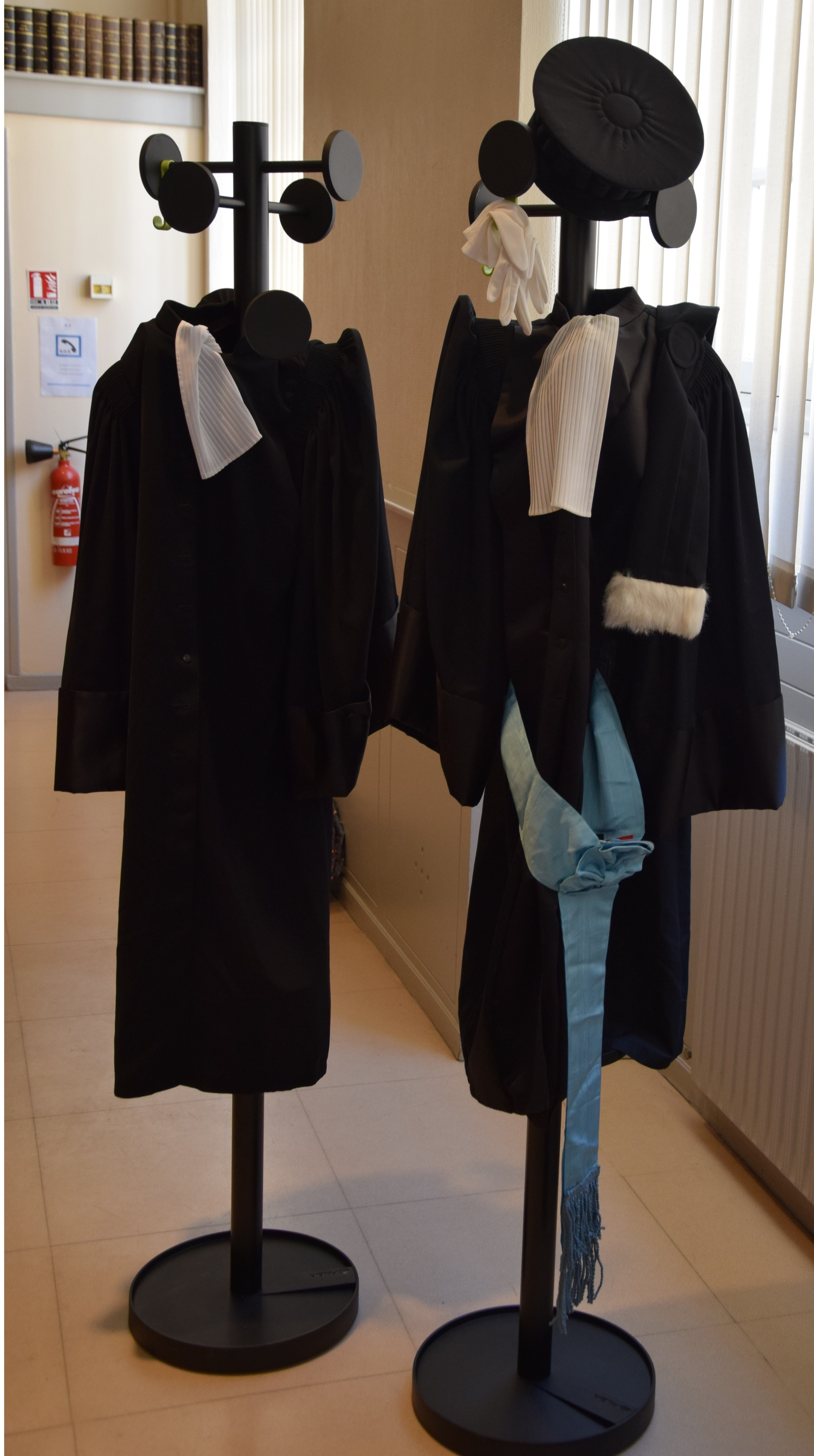
Robes worn by clerks in the Court of Appeal of Versailles

A court clerk (British English: clerk to the court or clerk of the court /klɑːrk/; American English: clerk of the court or clerk of court /klɜːrk/) is an officer of the court whose responsibilities include maintaining records of a court and administering oaths to witnesses and jurors as well as performing some quasi-secretarial duties. The records management duties of a court clerk include the acceptance of documents for filing with the court to become part of the court's official records, preserving and protecting those records, providing the general public with access to those records, and maintaining the docket, register of actions, and/or minutes of the court which list all filings and events in each case. These duties are important because the availability of legal relief often depends upon the timely filing of documents before applicable deadlines.

== United Kingdom ==
=== England and Wales ===
In the magistrates' courts of England and Wales, where the bench will usually have no legal qualifications, the justices' clerk will be legally qualified. The magistrates decide on the facts at issue; the clerk advises them on the law relating to the case. In the Crown Court the clerk is responsible for managing the courtroom and will sit at the front of the court below the judge. They empanel juries, arraign defendants and are responsible for maintaining the court record; which includes keeping a log of proceedings and creating warrants, notices and orders. Crown court clerks wear similar attire to a barrister, but without the wig; unless a High Court Judge is sitting.

=== Scotland ===
Clerks of court can be found at every level of the Courts of Scotland, with a legally qualified clerk acting as legal adviser to justices of the peace in justice of the peace courts. In the sheriff courts the clerk is known as a sheriff clerk, and the sheriff clerks are responsible for the administration and running of all cases in the court. Clerks also support and administer the Court of Session and High Court of Justiciary, with the Principal Clerk of Session and Justiciary responsible for the administration of the Supreme Courts of Scotland and for directing their associated staff.

== United States ==
=== Federal courts ===
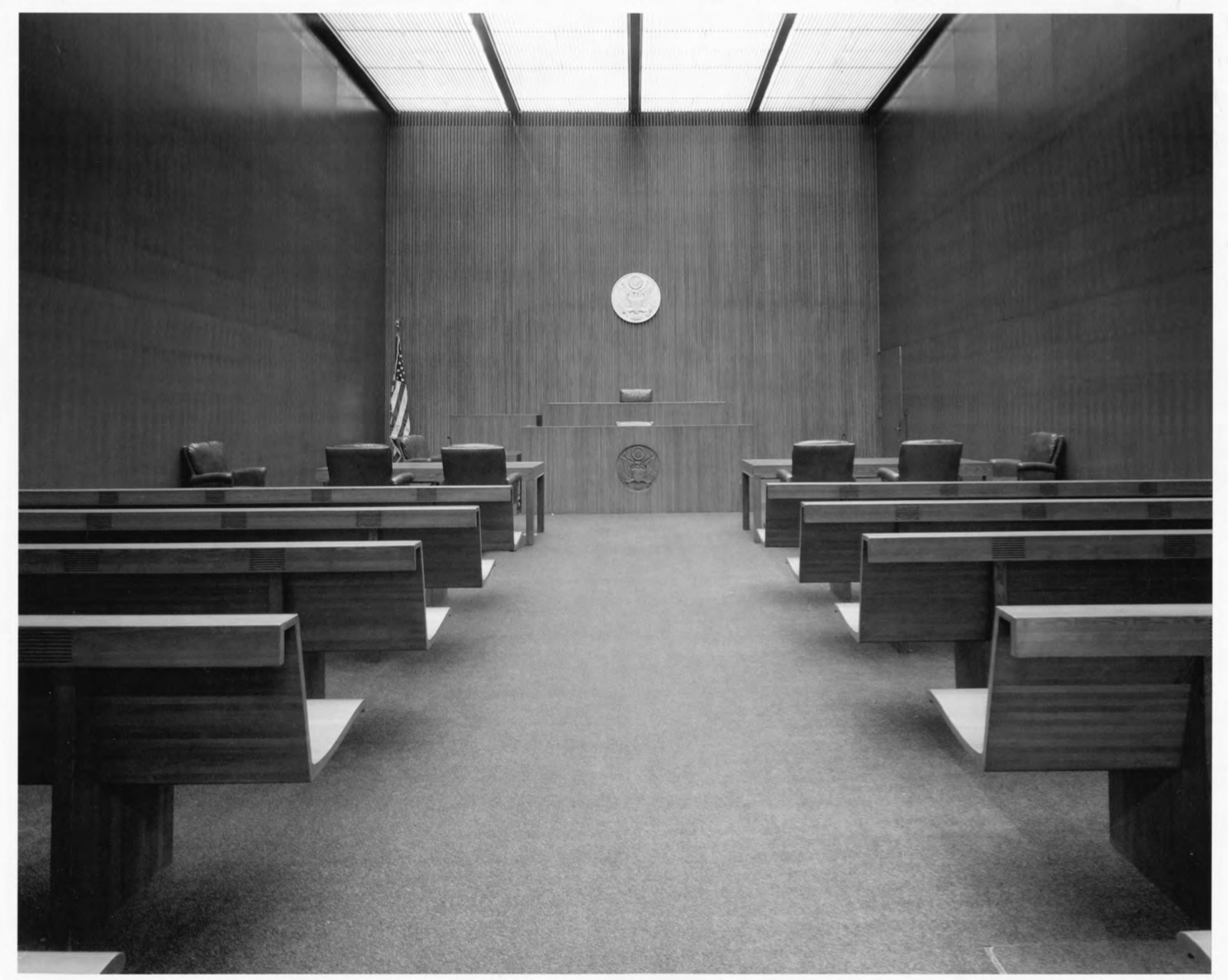
When attending court, clerks will often be sat in front of the judge's bench

Federal courts, including the Supreme Court of the United States, the United States courts of appeals, the various United States district courts (and their attached bankruptcy courts) and other Article III courts all employ a "clerk of court" who is the executive hired by the judges of the court to carry out the administration of the court. Among the clerk's core duties are the maintenance of court records (including trial exhibits), the custody and administration of the funds received by and dispensed from the court, the oversight of non-judicial personnel, and the provision of services to the judges of the court. A court reporter maintains the record of the court's proceedings.

=== State courts ===
Historically, some state trial courts have traditionally used the county clerk as the ex officio court clerk as a money-saving measure. Other states achieved the same result by making the court clerk the ex officio county clerk, as well as other roles such as county recorder, auditor, etc.

This consolidation of roles between the executive and judicial branches and between state and local governments was adopted as a cost-saving measure in rural counties on the American frontier when populations were sparse and judicial systems less developed. As counties became more densely populated, some trial courts sought to employ their own court clerks independent of county clerks. Attempts by state trial courts to do so were upheld by the Supreme Court of California in 1989 and the Supreme Court of Nevada in 2001.

In 32 states the clerk of court is elected in all or some counties.

== See also ==
- Prothonotary - the title of a chief court clerk in a small number of jurisdictions
