= Thomas R. Bruce =

American academic

Tom Bruce

Academic background
- Education: Yale University (BA, MFA)

Academic work
- Discipline: Legal information retrieval
- Institutions: Cornell University

Thomas R. "Tom" Bruce is an American academic and former software engineer who co-founded the Legal Information Institute at Cornell Law School with Peter Martin in 1992.

== Education ==
Bruce earned a Bachelor of Arts degree from Yale University and a Master of Fine Arts in stage management from the School of Drama at Yale University.

== Career ==
After graduating from Yale, Bruce worked as a stage and production manager for the Spoleto Festival USA, Texas Opera Theater, American Repertory Theater, and Greater Miami Opera. He joined Cornell Law School in 1988 as director of educational technologies. In 1992, Bruce co-founded the Legal Information Institute at Cornell. He is the author of Cello, the first Web browser for Microsoft Windows. Cello was first released on June 8, 1993.
