= Docket (court) =

Summary of law case

A docket in the United States is the official summary of proceedings in a court of law. In the United Kingdom in modern times it is an official document relating to delivery of something, with similar meanings to these two elsewhere. In the late nineteenth century the term referred to a large folio book in which clerks recorded all filings and court proceedings for each case, although use has been documented since 1485.

== Historical usage ==
The term originated in England; it was recorded in the form "doggette" in 1485, and later also as doket, dogget(t), docquett, docquet, and docket. The derivation and original sense are obscure, although it has been suggested that it derives from the verb "to dock", in the sense of cutting short (e.g. the tail of a dog or horse); a long document summarised has been docked, or docket using old spelling. It was long used in England for legal purposes (there was an official called the Clerk of the Dockets in the early nineteenth century), although discontinued in modern English legal usage.

Docket was described in The American and English Encyclopedia of Law as a courts summary, digest, or register. A usage note in this 1893 text warns that terms docket and calendar are not synonymous.

A 1910 law dictionary states the terms trial docket and calendar are synonymous.

== United States ==
In the United States, court dockets are considered to be public records, and many public records databases and directories include references to court dockets. Rules of civil procedure often state that the court clerk shall record certain information "on the docket" when a specific event occurs. The Federal Courts use the PACER (Public Access Court Electronic Records) system to house dockets and documents on all federal civil, criminal and bankruptcy cases, available to the public for a fee.

The term is also sometimes used informally to refer to a court calendar, the schedule of the appearances, arguments and hearings scheduled for a court. It may also be used as a metonym to refer to a court's caseload as a whole. Thus, either sense may be intended (depending upon the context) in the frequent use of the phrase "crowded dockets" by legal journalists and commentators.

=== Supreme Court ===
In its meaning as calendar, the docket of the United States Supreme Court is different both in its composition and significance. The justices of the Supreme Court have almost complete discretion over the cases they choose to hear. From the large number of cases which it receives, only 70 to 100 will be placed on the docket. The Solicitor General decides which cases to present on behalf of the federal government.

== See also ==
- Minutes
- Schedule
- Transcript (law)
