= British and Irish Legal Information Institute =

Legal database

Bailii
- Website type: Legal database
- Website: bailii.org
- Commercial: No

The British and Irish Legal Information Institute (BAILII, pronounced /ˈbeɪli/ "Bailey") provides legal information, and especially reports of cases decided by courts, in the United Kingdom generally and the Republic of Ireland. Decisions from England and Wales, the Republic of Ireland, Northern Ireland, Scotland, the European Union, and from the European Court of Human Rights, are put online. It is a partial online database of British and Irish legislation, case law, law reform reports, treaties and some legal scholarship.

== Background ==
Traditionally, legal information was accessible through a law report, usually written by private individuals or groups. While court judgments have had official reports more recently, historically a court judgment would simply be spoken, and so publication of the precedents built up depended on their record by interested third parties. The Year Books, which recorded judgments from 1268 to 1535, were probably compiled by law students. Other people, like the judge Sir Edward Coke from 1572 to 1615, then created their own series of reports. These would not necessarily be an accurate record of what was said. What was recorded might have been selective, or inaccurate. As the reporting industry developed, more people became involved and specialised in particular areas of law. The Incorporated Council of Law Reporting was created in 1885, and released copies of various cases. There still could be gaps in reporting however. With the advent of the Internet, it was possible to access multiple databases for a fee online, particularly Westlaw or Lexis. However a freely available source had not yet been made.

BAILII was set up after a long and hard campaign by various activists including senior members of the Society for Computers & Law, such as then-chairman Neil Cameron, barrister Laurie West-Knights QC, Lord Saville and Lord Justice Brooke, who were concerned about the lack of availability of court judgments to ordinary court users and were inspired by the Australasian Legal Information Institute (AustLII) LII. The aim was to provide free access to publicly available legal information. In 2006, BAILII included fourteen databases from five jurisdictions. The BAILII website is jointly hosted by the Institute of Advanced Legal Studies at the University of London and the Law School of University College, Cork (UCC).

== Case citations ==
Bailii uses a "neutral citation" method, which was quickly adopted as a standard for citation of cases. The different series of cases that Bailii produces are as follows.

Abbreviation	Bailii series
UKSC	United Kingdom Supreme Court
UKHL	United Kingdom House of Lords
UKPC	United Kingdom Privy Council
EWCA Civ	England and Wales Court of Appeal, Civil Division
EWCA Crim	England and Wales Court of Appeal, Criminal Division
EWHC	England and Wales High Court

== Criticism ==
BAILII has received criticisms due to the restrictions it imposes on its usage: in a Guardian editorial, it was noted that BAILII had "done a wonderful job of making case law freely accessible to lawyers", including "historic and European data that is otherwise very difficult to find." However, it was also noted that as a small charity the service "struggles to afford to host its 297,000 judgments, and does not allow search engines to index them. In some instances it is not even clear whether the crown or the judge concerned holds the copyright to the words, and reproducing them on any other site is forbidden." The site's own copyright policy notes that use of its HTML versions of judgments is "prohibited".

An organization known as Judgmental had been established to scrape information from BAILII and make it indexable by search engines. Founding members of Judgmental included Francis Irving, one of the developers of TheyWorkForYou. Judgmental shut down under threat of legal action regarding the court records for a libel case.

Former BAILII chairman Henry Brooke defended criticisms, stating that the restrictions on indexing were to ensure that records could be retroactively edited or removed for clerical or legal reasons, such as errors, information that was not authorized to be published, or records that have not been properly anonymized. Brooke went on to explain that BAILII "[does] not consider that taking the extra step of making the judgments searchable, using Google or other search engines, is necessary in order to achieve the primary objective of making judgments of the courts freely available to the public." He also stated that the restriction on redistribution was to protect its "value-added content", such as "converting it into a suitable format and making efforts to prevent the publication of material that must not be published".

== Access to case law ==
Much of the material available on BAILII is duplicated elsewhere, for example legislation and rulings of some courts (such as the Supreme Court). BAILII has an agreement with the Ministry of Justice indemnifying it from some legal prosecutions. BAILII has historically received payment as part of this contract. In the 2010/2011 tax year BAILII received £35,468 as part of this contract.

== See also ==
- AustLII
- Free Access to Law Movement
- Case citation
