= Australasian Legal Information Institute =

AustLII logo

The Australasian Legal Information Institute (AustLII) is an institution operated jointly by the Faculties of Law of the University of Technology Sydney and the University of New South Wales. Its public policy purpose is to improve access to justice through access to legal information.

== Inception and aims ==
AustLII was established in 1995. Founded as a joint program of the University of Technology Sydney and the University of New South Wales law schools, its initial funding was provided by the Australian Research Council. The founding co-directors Graham Greenleaf and Andrew Mowbray, and current managing director Philip Chung were appointed as Members of the Order of Australia for their contributions to public access to legal information.

== Content ==
AustLII content is publicly available legal information. Its primary source information includes legislation, treaties and decisions of courts and tribunals. It also hosts secondary legal materials, including law reform and royal commission reports, as well as legal journals. The AustLII databases include the complete text of all of the decisions of the High Court, decisions of the Federal Court from 1977 onwards (the decisions between 1977 and 1996 were selected by the Federal Court), and decisions of the Family Court from 1988 onwards (as selected by the Family Court), as well as a number of other federal and state courts and tribunals.

== See also ==
- Federal Register of Legislation (Australian Government's online register of federal legislation)
- Free Access to Law Movement
- Legal Information Institute
