= Free Access to Law Movement =

International voluntary association

The Free Access to Law Movement (FALM) is the international organization devoted to providing free online access to legal information such as case law, legislation, treaties, law reform proposals and legal scholarship. The movement began in 1992 with the creation of the Legal Information Institute (LII) by Thomas R. Bruce and Peter W. Martin at Cornell Law School. Some later FALM projects incorporate Legal Information Institute or LII in their names, usually prefixed by a national or regional identifier.

== Membership ==
The FALM website lists 63 active members as of July 2017, together with the coverage (geographical area or political grouping) for which each member provides databases, and the year in which it became a member of FALM, as well as links to member websites.

== Declaration ==
In October 2002 the meeting of LIIs in Montreal at the 4th Law via Internet Conference made the following declaration as a joint statement of their philosophy of access to law. There were some further modifications of the Declaration at the Sydney meeting of LIIs in 2003 and at the Paris meeting in 2004.

Legal information institutes of the world, meeting in Montreal, declare that:

- Public legal information from all countries and international institutions is part of the common heritage of humanity. Maximising access to this information promotes justice and the rule of law;
- Public legal information is digital common property and should be accessible to all on a non-profit basis and free of charge;
- Independent non-profit organisations have the right to publish public legal information and the government bodies that create or control that information should provide access to it so that it can be published.

Public legal information means legal information produced by public bodies that have a duty to produce law and make it public. It includes primary sources of law, such as legislation, case law and treaties, as well as various secondary (interpretative) public sources, such as reports on preparatory work and law reform, and resulting from boards of inquiry. It also includes legal documents created as a result of public funding.

A legal information institute:

- Publishes via the internet public legal information originating from more than one public body;
- Provides free, full and anonymous public access to that information;
- Does not impede others from publishing public legal information; and
- Supports the objectives set out in this Declaration.

All legal information institutes are encouraged to participate in regional or global free access to law networks.

Therefore, the legal information institutes agree:

- To promote and support free access to public legal information throughout the world, principally via the Internet;
- To cooperate in order to achieve these goals and, in particular, to assist organisations in developing countries to achieve these goals, recognising the reciprocal advantages that all obtain from access to each other's law;
- To help each other and to support, within their means, other organisations that share these goals with respect to,
  - Promotion, to governments and other organisations, of public policy conducive to the accessibility of public legal information;
  - Technical assistance, advice and training;
  - Development of open technical standards;
  - Academic exchange of research results.
- To meet at least annually, and to invite other organisations who are legal information institutes to subscribe to this declaration and join those meetings, according to procedures to be established by the parties to this Declaration.
- To provide to the end users of public legal information clear information concerning any conditions of re-use of that information, where this is feasible.

== See also ==
- Comparative law wiki
- Legal awareness
- Ravel Law
- Free Law Project
- Public.Resource.Org § Access to United States legal resources
