= Legal technology =

Technology and software to provide legal services

Legal technology, also known as legal tech, refers to the use of technology and software to provide legal services and support the legal industry. Legal technology encompasses the use of traditional software architecture and web technologies, such as searchable databases of case law and other legal authority, as well as machine learning technologies, such as those used to automatically search documents for purposes of due diligence or discovery. Work on making contracts more easy to use involve aspects of user experience design, and artificial intelligence.

Alternative legal service providers (ALSPs) increasingly use legal technology to deliver transactional legal work at scale, helping in-house legal teams improve service delivery, streamline operations, and redirect capacity to higher-value tasks.

== Definitions ==
Legal technology traditionally referred to the application of technology and software to help individual lawyers, law firms, medium and large scale businesses with practice management, document automation, document storage, billing, accounting and electronic discovery.

== History ==
From the 1970s through to the 1990s there were several academic attempts to formalize legal reasoning, a knowledge representation task. The International Conference of Artificial Intelligence and Law (ICAIL) has been held since 1987 The first commercially available legal AI system was an expert system released in 1988 by the University of Oxford to tell users if a new piece of legislation, the latent damage act applied to them. Since 2000, there have been more attempts to make legal tasks easier using machine learning approaches rather than knowledge representation. In the mid 2000s so-called predictive coding became possible for use in the discovery process of litigation. These predictive coding tools helped lawyers predict which documents were relevant or irrelevant for the litigation, after having been trained on a subset of documents.

In 1975 in the US, the Federal Judicial Center started the COURTRAN project for the electronic recording of court records. This was initially used for criminal cases, but later was adapted for managing civil cases. COURTRAN was replaced by the Integrated Case Management System in the mid 1980s. The Legal Information Institute was set up in 1992, at Cornell University with the aim of making law more accessible, and began providing access to US supreme court decisions. Development of the PACER to nationwide access to court records, began in 1990 and by the mid 1990s, 180 federal courts were offering fee based access to court records via Dial-up Internet access. The E-Government Act of 2002 limited the fees to only the extent necessary. The Open Courts Act of 2020 set out a plan to make PACER free to use by 2025.

Some legal technology seek to provide consumers with access to online software that reduces or eliminates the need to consult a lawyer, or by connecting people with lawyers more efficiently. For example, companies have emerged to assist with air passenger compensation claims under the EU's Flight Compensation Regulation without the need for a lawyer.

== Applications ==
=== Case law databases ===
Use of tools to aid with legal research is very common within the legal field. Commercial companies such as Practical Law Company, LexisNexis, and Reuters offer services where a lawyer can pay to search case law. In the early 1990s the Cornell Legal Information Institute (ILL) started to provide free of charge full text access to US Supreme Court judgements. A database of Canadian Supreme Court decisions was hosted under the name LexUM. In Australia the AustLII (Australasian Legal Information Institute) was founded in 1995. It was the first free case law database to achieve national coverage and now comprises over 200 databases with case law from virtually all courts and tribunals. The British and Irish Legal Information Institute (BAILII) was established in 1999. These initiatives demonstrated the strong demand for free public access to case law to aid legal research and the Free Access to Law Movement was formally established in 2002. In the US the Caselaw Access Project, run by Harvard Law School, had by 2018 scanned in excess of 40 million legal documents relating to reported US state and federal cases. US case law is made accessible free of charge and via an application programming interface (API). Several computational legal corpora have also been published in other jurisdictions including the European Court of Human Rights, Germany, Korea, Australia, Canada, and the UK, as well as multi-national datasets such as MultiLegalPile and LexFiles.

=== Document automation ===
Legal technology companies such as LegalZoom and Rocket Lawyer provide consumers and small businesses with document automation services. Document drafting is rules-based legal work and drafts of legal documents, such as contracts and the documents required for company formation, can be reliably generated through an interactive website. LegalZoom and Rocket Lawyer can assemble the full range of legal documents required in the United States to be filed in court for official record or court proceedings. Document automation service assemble legal documents out of templates with fill-in-blanks. The legal document is interactively assembled via a question and answer program, where the user is responding to queries. Law firms have access to a range of document automation services on a subscription basis. Lawyers can automate their own templates or pay to access prefabricated templates. Since the 1970s more than 65 legal document automation services have been commercially available to lawyers. Well established document automation services for lawyers include ContractExpress and HotDocs.

Template based document automation works best for contracts that use boilerplate clause, model contracts or standard clauses. The integration of predictive analytics allows for predictive contracting, where the drafter is provided with statistical information about the likelihood that a nonstandard clause will be subject to litigation or adverse judicial interpretation. Contract analytics services provided by LexPredict and Bloomberg L.P. use natural language processing (NLP) tools to find unique clauses in contracts by identifying statistical patterns within language syntax.

There have been attempts to improve the design of contracts, which have traditionally been seen as documents by lawyers for lawyers. Suggested improvements to the design of contracts have considered how contracts could convey more information visually, more directly address business needs, and improve relationships between the parties of a contract. Scholars have suggested the use of so-called self-executing contracts, where the terms of the contract are automatically updated by a computer using predefined rules. A further step would be the generation of a machine-readable representation of the contract that could be used in other automated processes such as contract lifecycle management. Recent commentary in the legal AI field has emphasized that the success of agentic systems in contract review depends less on autonomy and more on producing verifiable, trustworthy outputs that legal teams can rely on. Recent commentary has also examined the emergence of generative AI tools designed for non-attorney users, which aim to assist with the preparation of standardized legal documents and preliminary legal materials without direct attorney involvement.

== Cyberjustice ==
The judiciary have expressed interest in the potential for electronics filing to reduce costs and increase efficiency and online alternative dispute resolution as a means to reduce costs to claimants increasing access to justice. Technological approaches are being used to provide guidance for sentencing and pretrial detention in some courts, including machine-learning based solutions which have been criticized for potential racial bias issues. Litigation outcome prediction tools have been introduced to the market by the big three legal research providers LexisNexis, Westlaw, and Bloomberg Law. The Lex Machina estimates a judges' likelihood of granting or denying a motion. Litigation outcome prediction tools have been criticized for potentially harming access to justice, as would-be litigants with claims that are judged too novel or less viable may be denied legal representation.

== Approaches ==
Artificial intelligence, machine learning and natural language processing are being applied to machine learning tasks particularly those related to search, such as due diligence and discovery in litigation cases.

Knowledge graphs are being applied to assist in the creation, management, and analysis of smart contracts.

Rule-based expert system have been used for the purposes knowledge representation and querying legal knowledge, one such example being TurboTax. These approaches are studied in Legal informatics.

== Industry context ==
Although the legal industry was traditionally slow to adopt new technologies, the present legal environment requires greater adaptation to and incorporation of technology, with the American Bar Association voting in August 2012 to amend the Model Rules of Professional Conduct to require lawyers to keep abreast of "the benefits and risks associated with relevant technology", and in late 2019, the Federation of Law Societies of Canada adopted a similar amendment to the Model Code of Professional Conduct. The saturation of the market is leading many lawyers to look for cutting-edge ways to compete. The exponential growth in the volume of documents (mostly email) that must be reviewed for litigation cases has greatly accelerated the adoption of technology used in eDiscovery, with elements of machine language and artificial intelligence being incorporated and cloud-based services being adopted by law firms.

Stanford Law School has started CodeX, the Center for Legal Informatics, an interdisciplinary research center, which also incubates companies started by law students and computer scientists. Some companies that have come out of the program include Lex Machina and Legal.io.

Funding for legal technology companies surged 44% year-over-year to about $3.56 billion in the first half of 2025.

== Societal issues ==
Many critics have voiced concerns about the risk of bias in the decisions made by models trained using machine learning approaches such as sentencing decisions, arguing that a model could learn the bias in existing decisions. Others have voiced concerns about the explainable of the decisions made by machine learning models arguing that such models can be a black box. There are concerns about the possibility that models could be viewed as objective and infalliable when they are not.

There is interest in the use of legal technology to increase access to justice. Programs have attempted to use legal technology to improve access to justice by improving processes, automating access to legal information and advice, and improving user interaction.

== Key areas ==
Traditional areas of Legal Tech include:

- Contract Management
- Matter and Case Management
- Accounting
- Billing
- Document automation
- Document storage
- Electronic discovery
- Enterprise legal management
- Legal research
- Practice management
- Case management
- E-Signature platform
- Service of Process

More recent areas of growth in Legal Tech focus on:

- Providing tools or a marketplace to connect clients with lawyers
- Client relationship management (CRM) tools
- Providing tools for consumers and businesses to complete legal matters by themselves, obviating the need for a lawyer
- Data and contract analytics
- Law practice optimization
- Use of legally binding digital signature, which helps verify the digital identity of each signer, maintains the chain of custody for the documents and can provide audit trails
- Automation of legal writing or other substantive aspects of legal practice
- Machine readable contracts
- Platforms for succession planning i.e. Will writing, via online applications
- Providing tools to assist with immigration document preparation in lieu of hiring a lawyer.
