= Freeman Harris Solicitors =

English law firm

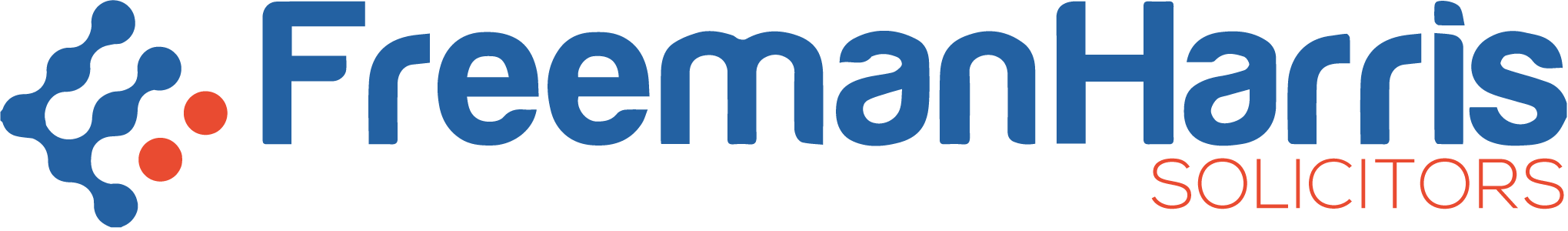
- Company type: Partnership
- Industry: Lawyers, Solicitors, Corporate and Commercial law
- Founded: 2006
- Headquarters: London, SE10; United Kingdom
- Number of locations: 3
- Area served: United Kingdom
- Services: Legal advice
- Number of employees: 25
- Website: freemanharris.co.uk

Freeman Harris Solicitors is an English law firm based in London and Dunstable. In 2010, Freeman Harris became the first law firm to operate a legal store in a shopping centre in the UK.

== Company ==
The company was started in December, 2006, by Ian Freeman and Sam Harris, with an office in Bermondsey, London. Freeman Harris was one of the founding members of QualitySolicitors, which is an alliance of independent law firms in the United Kingdom. In 2010, the company become the first law firm to operate a legal store in a shopping mall in Lewisham. The store offered legal advice and services to visitors in a shop style format.

In 2013, Freeman Harris partnered with LegalForce to provide legal solutions online and in stores to small businesses and start-ups. The partnership has since dissolved and both firms work independently.
