= LPO =

LPO may refer to:

- Lipid peroxidation
- LPO-50, a flamethrower built by the Soviet Union
- Law practice optimization
- Landing Page Optimization
- Leading Petty Officer
- Legal Process Outsourcing
- Leningrad Philharmonic Orchestra, the former name of the St. Petersburg Philharmonic Orchestra
- Lexicographic path ordering, a well-ordering in term rewriting (computer science)
- Libertarian Party of Ohio
- Libration point orbit
- Licensed Post Office
- Limited principle of omniscience
- London Philharmonic Orchestra
- Louisiana Philharmonic Orchestra
- Lactoperoxidase, an antibacterial protein present in milk and saliva
