= Davies Ward Phillips & Vineberg =

Law firm of Canada

Davies Ward Phillips & Vineberg LLP
- Headquarters: Toronto
- No. of offices: 3
- No. of lawyers: 242
- Major practice areas: General practice (business law)
- Date founded: 1895 (Phillips & Vineberg); 1961 (Davies Ward & Beck); 2001 (Davies Ward Phillips & Vineberg)
- Company type: Limited liability partnership
- Website: www.dwpv.com

Davies Ward Phillips & Vineberg LLP is one of Canada's "Seven Sisters" law firms with offices in Toronto, Montréal and New York City. The firm is focused on business law and acts on a wide range of commercial and financial matters on behalf of its Canadian, United States and international clients.

Commonly referred to as "Davies", the firm works for a wide range of public and private companies, as well as governments, regulatory bodies and international agencies.

== History ==
The firm was formed on February 1, 2001, through the merger of two companies: Davies Ward & Beck, founded in 1961, and Phillips & Vineberg, founded in 1895.

== Recognition ==
The 2019 Lexpert/American Lawyer Guide to the Leading 500 Lawyers in Canada ranks Davies as a leading Canadian firm in corporate transactions.

The Practical Law Company lists Davies as a "Leading" corporate/M&A firm and lists a large number of individual lawyers at Davies as "Endorsed".

== Notable Lawyers ==
- Lucien Bouchard (Partner from 2001 onwards), 27th Premier of Quebec from 1996 to 2001.
- Melanie Joly, Minister of Industry and Minister responsible for the Economic Development Agency of Canada for the Regions of Quebec.
- Nigel S. Wright (Partner from 1990–1997) Chief of Staff to Prime Minister Stephen Harper.
- David Ward (Founding Partner from 1961–2010), Notable Tax Lawyer.
- Adam Fanaki (Senior Partner from 2009–2020), Competition Lawyer and Namesake of the Adam F. Fanaki Competition Law Moot.

== See also ==
- Bennett Jones
