= LegalZoom =

American legal technology company

LegalZoom.com, Inc.
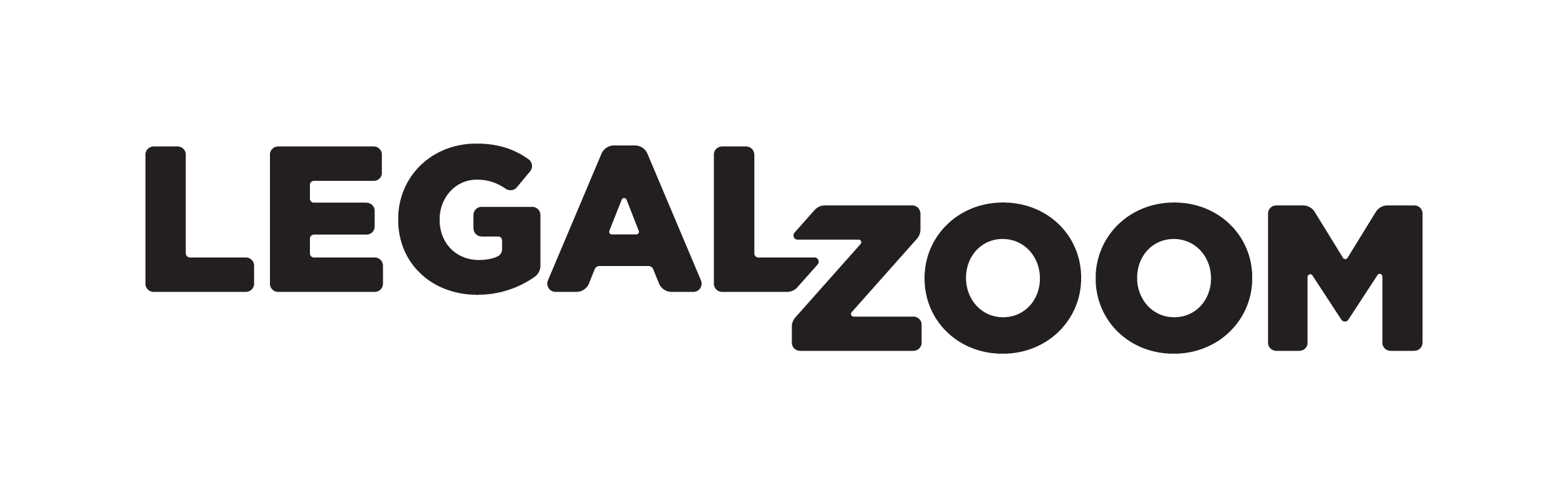
- LegalZoom logo

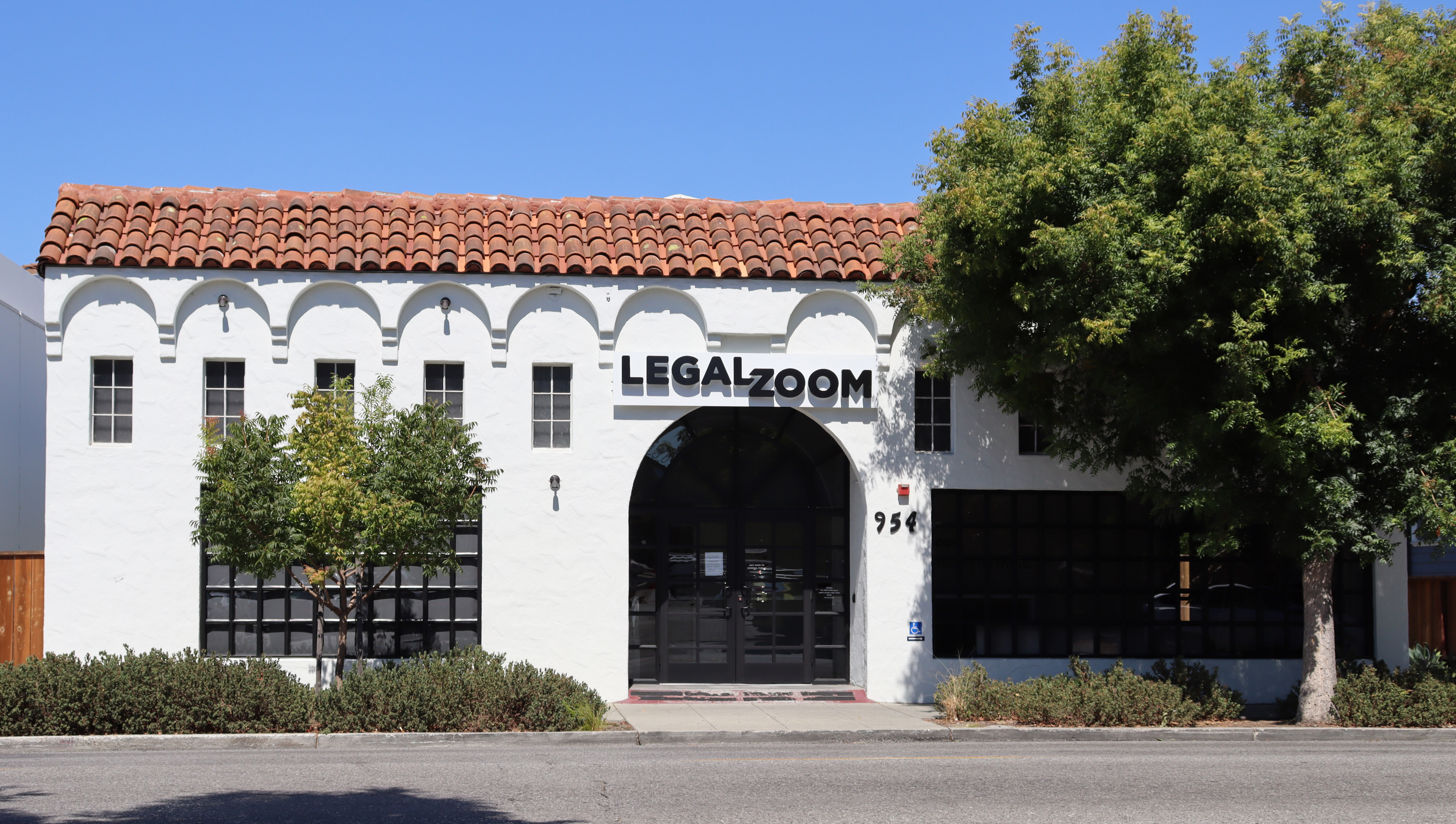
- Headquarters in Mountain View
- Type: Public
- Traded as: Nasdaq: LZ; Russell 2000 component; S&P 600 component
- Industry: Online legal services; Legal technology
- Founded: March 12, 2001; 25 years ago
- Founders: Brian P.Y. Liu; Brian S. Lee; Edward R. Hartman; Robert Shapiro
- Headquarters: Mountain View, California, U.S.
- Area served: United States
- Key people: Jeffrey Stibel (CEO),[Noel Watson (COO and CFO), Nicole Miller (CLO)
- Revenue: ▲US$681.9 million (2024)
- Operating income: ▲US$35.6 million (2024)
- Net income: ▲US$30.0 million (2024)
- Total assets: ▼US$373.9 million (2024)
- Total equity: ▼US$93.3 million (2024)
- Number of employees: 1,190 (2023)
- Website: legalzoom.com

LegalZoom.com, Inc. is an American online legal technology and services company launched in 2001. It provides online legal services using an independent network of attorneys and the LegalZoom-owned law firm, LegalZoom Legal Services, as well as self-service technology and care specialists. Services include wills and living trusts, business compliance such as licenses and permits, copyright registrations, and trademark applications. The company also offers attorney referrals and registered agent services.

Cited as a disruption to traditional consumer legal services, the company asserts that it benefits people who otherwise could not hire a lawyer.

LegalZoom was founded by Brian S. Lee, Brian Liu, Edward Hartman, and Robert Shapiro.

== Reception ==
Based on concerns that LegalZoom's services were a form of legal advice, the North Carolina State Bar issued a cease and desist order in 2008. After an investigation by a special referee, the court determined that LegalZoom's practices "do not constitute the unauthorized practice of law". Similar lawsuits in other states were settled or dismissed.

Consumer Reports magazine gave mixed reviews in September 2012 to the computer-aided legal forms generated by LegalZoom and two of its competitors, Nolo (formerly Nolo Press) and Rocket Lawyer, stating that all three companies provided documents "for a fraction of what you'd pay a lawyer". Consumer Reports wrote that "using any of the three services is generally better than drafting the documents yourself without legal training or not having them at all. But unless your needs are simple ... none of the will-writing products is likely to entirely meet your needs." It found in some cases, the other non-will documents weren't specific enough or contained language that could potentially lead to an unintended result.

In 2015, LegalZoom and the North Carolina Bar Association settled years of litigation by agreeing that companies like LegalZoom, which offer automated legal document preparation, will not violate North Carolina's prohibitions against the unauthorized practice of law if the companies register with the state and comply with certain consumer protection procedures. Following the settlement, the US Federal Trade Commission and the US Department of Justice jointly advised the North Carolina Legislature that the state should avoid placing overly broad restrictions on companies that offer computer-facilitated legal services. The two agencies stated that "[i]nteractive software for generating legal forms may be more cost-effective for some consumers, may exert downward price pressure on licensed lawyer services, and may promote the more efficient and convenient provision of legal services. Such products may also help increase access to legal services."

== Recognition ==
The company was nominated for the American Bar Association's 2005 Louis M. Brown Award. In 2011, Business Insider ranked LegalZoom 27th on its list of the world's most valuable startups, and in 2012, Fast Company ranked LegalZoom 26th on its list of the most innovative companies.

== Growth, acquisitions and partnerships ==
LegalZoom formed a partnership in 2012 with the United Kingdom-based legal services provider QualitySolicitors to jointly offer online legal services in the United Kingdom. In 2014, European private capital firm Permira announced its intent to acquire $200 million in the outstanding equity of LegalZoom and become its largest shareholder; on February 14, 2014, Permira announced that the deal was complete. LegalZoom announced in 2015 they would Beaumont Legal, a 200-year-old firm in Wakefield, West Yorkshire, England which describes itself as one of the largest conveyancers in the country.

LegalZoom announced its initial public offering in 2021 and became the first publicly traded company to own and operate a law firm in the United States. Later that year, the company expanded its network of attorneys following the Arizona Supreme Court approval of an alternative business structure license.

In 2021, LegalZoom acquired Earth Class Mail, a virtual mailbox service for businesses, for $63 million. In 2022, the company acquired Revv, a Global SaaS document automation and form template company based in Bangalore, India. In 2023, they announced a partnership with Novo, a financial technology firm focused on digital banking for small businesses.

In May 2024, LegalZoom entered a partnership with Wix.com, a website builder and web development platform, offering an all-in-one launch solution for entrepreneurs. That same year, BusinessLoans.com partnered with LegalZoom to provide LegalZoom users with a pathway to compare and apply for small business loans.

LegalZoom acquired Formation Nation, a small business services company focused on business formation and compliance that operates the Nevada Corporate Headquarters (NCH) and Inc Authority brands, in 2025, and partnered with Perplexity AI, an artificial intelligence company, to enhance its legal technology offerings.
