= Karin Mayer Rubinstein =

Israeli lawyer (born 1971)

- קרין מאיר רובינשטין
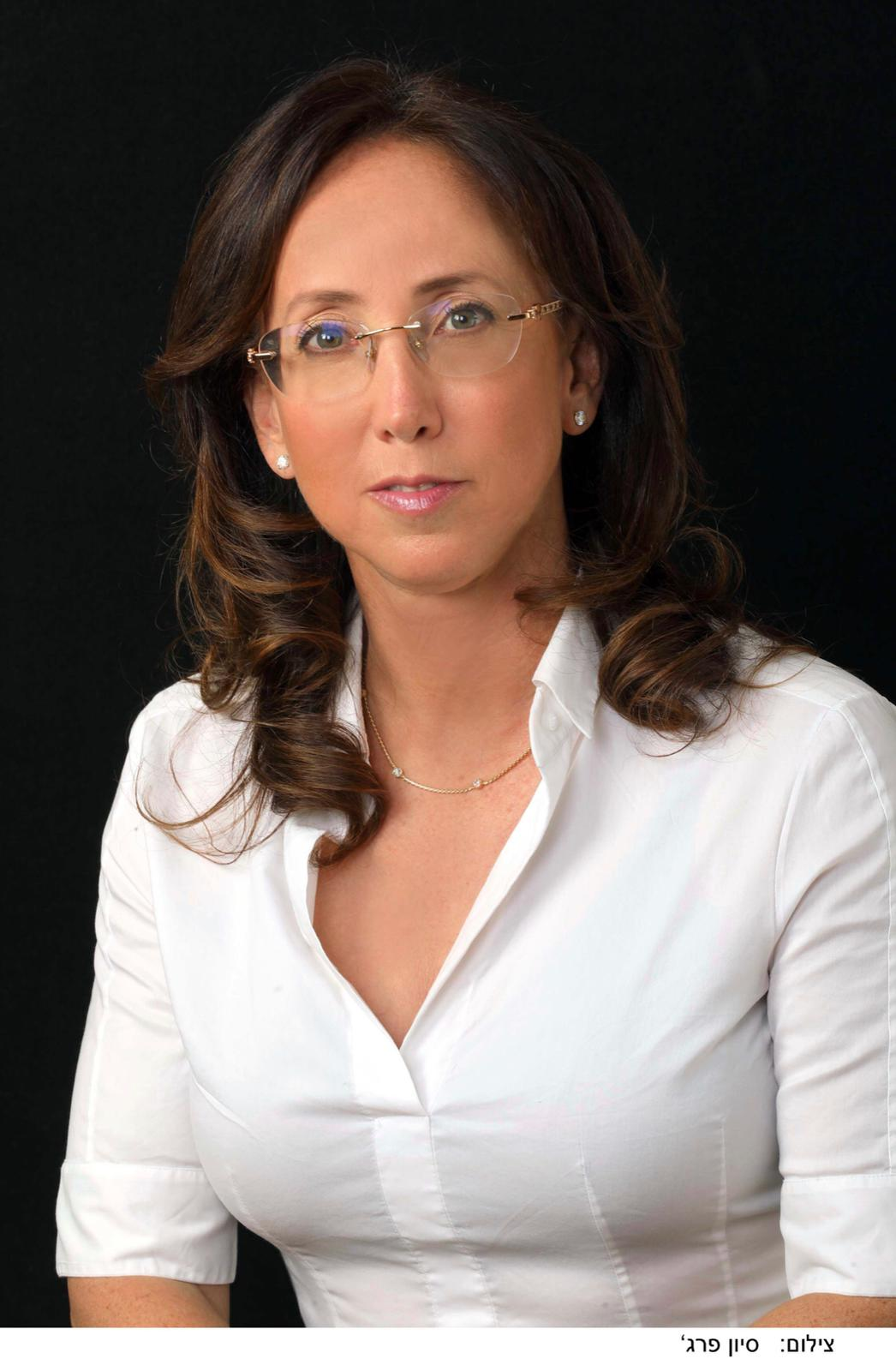
- Born: Karin Mayer; April 23, 1971 (age 55); Tel Aviv, Israel
- Education: Tel Aviv University: BA Economics LLB Law MBA (and finance)
- Occupations: CEO & President of IATI
- Known for: CEO and President of Israel's Association of Tech Industries (IATI)
- Spouse: Golan Rubinstein
- Children: 3

Karin Mayer Rubinstein (Hebrew: קרין מאיר רובינשטין; born April 23, 1971) is the CEO and president of IATI, the umbrella association of Israel’s high‑tech and innovation industries.

== Personal life ==
Karin Mayer Rubinstein was born in Tel Aviv. Her father is Shai Mayer, who ran the Shalom Mayer Tower, and his father, Mordechai Mayer, Karin's grandfather, was one of the founders of the tower and one of Tel Aviv's founders.

Karin attended Alliance High School in Tel Aviv.

In 1992 she received her B.A. in economics with honors from Tel Aviv University. In 1996 she completed her first degree (LLB) in law and an MBA (finance) from Tel Aviv University.

Married to Golan Rubinstein CEO of Golden-House LTD. and mother of three children. She lives in Tel Aviv.

== Career ==
In 1996–1997 she was an intern of the late Rut Oren in the law firm of S. Horowitz & Co.

In 1997 she joined Efrati Galili Law Firm, and later became a senior partner and manager of the firm's business development division.

In 2008-2011 she served as a senior partner and VP of Strategy, International Relations, and Business Development at Herzog, Fox, Neeman & Co. law firm.

Since 2011 she serves as CEO and president of the Israel's Association of Tech Industries (IATI), the umbrella association of Israel’s high‑tech and innovation industries, which includes more than 700 members from all sectors in Israel: local and foreign venture capital and investment funds, growth-stage and established Israeli companies, multinational R&D centers, startups, healthcare providers, tech transfer organizations, academic institutions and more.

Mayer Rubinstein was chosen twice in a row for one of the "Top 100 Young Business Leaders" of Forbes magazine Israel, and as one of the 40 leading business leaders of The Marker.

Karin represents Israel and its innovation industry on a regular basis as key speaker in a multitude of events held worldwide, including some held at the UN. In addition, she serves as a judge in many Israeli and global tech competitions.

== Roles and positions ==
- CEO and president of Israel Association of Tech Industries (IATI)
- Member of the Jewish Agency Board of Governors (JFNA).
- Member of the National Committee for Increasing Human Capital in High-Tech
- Member of the council of The Tel Aviv Foundation.
- Member of the Board of Trustees at Shenkar.
- Member of the Board of International Chamber of Commerce (ICC).
- Member of the Board of the Herzliya Development Fund.
- Member of the Council of the Israeli Opera.
- Member of the Steering Committee of Next October.
- Member of the Advisory Board at the Business School at Reichman University.
- Member of the Council of Anu-Banu.
- Member of 8400 The Health Network.
- Member of the Board of Spirit of Israel.

== Links ==
- Karin's Article in the "Israeli High Tech Book" by The Marker - Towards 2021, marking the targets to push the economy.
- The industry review by the Innovation Authority & IATI. Globes, July 21, 2020.
- Freezing the Innovation Authority budget - a critical hit for the entire industry, Calcalist, February 23, 2020.
- Karin Mayer Rubinstein, Setting up high tech funds requires guidance & training. The Marker, July 13, 2017
- Karin Mayer Rubinstein, More than positioning: Israel's tech challenges, The Jerusalem Post, September 5, 2016.
- Idan Rabi, "less than 5% of investments in High Tech are made by Israelis", Globes, July 15, 2015
- Karin Mayer Rubinstein, This is how Israel can shock Bloomberg's Innovation Index, The Marker, February 12, 2013.
- Sagit Fastman, Lesson number 10: Don't be afraid to fail, Saloona, December 31, 2013.
