= Magi Otsri =

Israeli Activist

Margalit (Magi) Otsri
- מרגלית (מגי) אוצרי
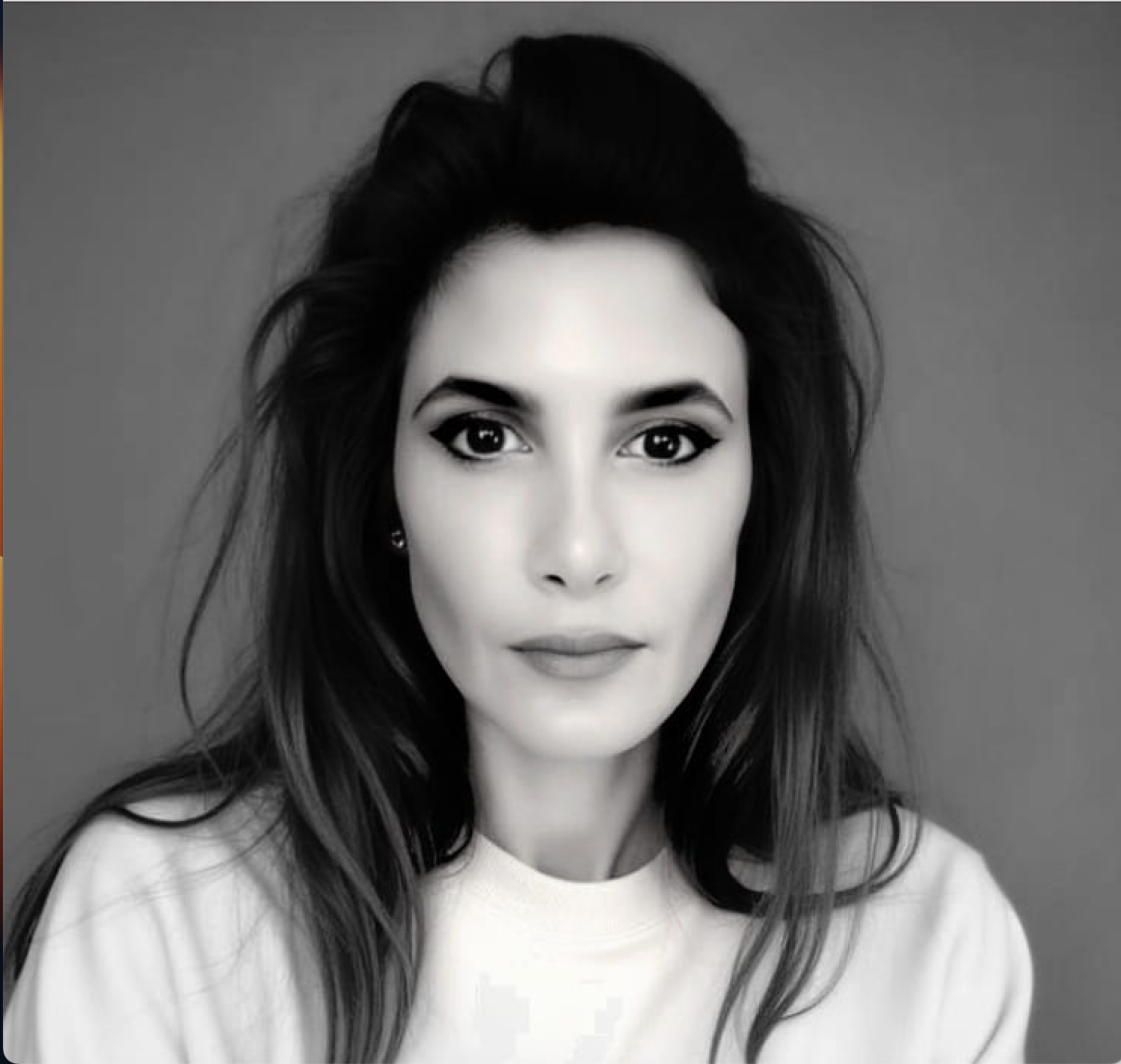
- Born: August 10, 1983 (age 43); Haifa, Israel
- Citizenship: Israel
- Education: PhD in Law, Tel Aviv University
- Alma mater: Tel Aviv University
- Occupations: Author, screenwriter, legal scholar, activist
- Writing career
- Pen name: Margot Meirom
- Subjects: Law and humanities, Pragmatics, Humor studies, Ethics
- Notable awards: Minister of Culture and Sports award in the field of Hebrew literary creation (2021)

Margalit (Magi) Otsri (Hebrew: מרגלית (מגי) אוצרי; born August 10, 1983) is an Israeli author, publicist, left-wing political activist, and doctor of law. She received the Dvora Omer Award, the Minister of Culture and Sports' award in the field of Hebrew literary creation, for her book "Red Eyes" in 2021.

== Biography ==
Magi Otsri was born in Haifa to Natela and Yosef Otsri (formerly Ocherashvili), Sephardic Jews who immigrated to Israel from Georgia in 1973. She grew up in the Neve Paz neighborhood and later moved to Neve Sha'anan, Tel Aviv. Otsri served in the Israel Defense Forces (IDF) as a clerk in a fighter squadron.

After completing her military service, Otsri studied law at Tel Aviv University, working as a research assistant to Professor Daphne Barak-Erez during her undergraduate studies. She interned at the law firm S. Horowitz & Co.

Otsri holds a PhD in law from Tel Aviv University. During her doctoral studies, she was a fellow at the "Buchmann Faculty of Law's Meiter Center for Law and Humanities." Her dissertation focused on the topic of "The Morality and Legality of Offensive Humor."

Otsri is a graduate of acting studies at Gal Amitai’s Acting Studio. She also completed a workshop in the Chubbuck acting technique.

Otsri has publicly shared that she experienced a sexual assault at age six and was diagnosed with bipolar disorder in 2020. During a manic episode, she completed her 300-page dissertation in a month and a half.

== Political Views and Artistic Philosophy ==
Otsri is an outspoken critic of Netanyahu's government and the Israeli occupation in the West Bank, both in her opinion articles and on her widely followed Twitter account. She frequently appears on television panels, and has been featured in segments on Israel's Channel 14, a network aligned with Netanyahu's government, where her statements against Netanyahu and the Israeli military have been criticized. In one such segment, she was identified as a leader of the anti-Netanyahu protest movement and as a successor to Hannah Arendt and Shulamit Aloni. She has also spoken out against attempts to impose religious influence (hadata) and the exclusion of women in Israeli society. In September 2024, after Otsri publicly opposed a gender-segregated event held in Tel Aviv's Dizengoff Square, Israel's Minister of Culture, Miki Zohar, criticized her on social media, writing: "It is a disgrace that someone who won the Minister of Culture Prize for Hebrew Literary Creation in 2021 speaks out against a Jewish religious expression in her own country."

Otsri also frequently speaks out about the urgent need to bring back the Israeli hostages from Gaza through a ceasefire deal, and has publicly expressed her support for a two-state solution and for a political agreement that would grant the Palestinians an independent state.

On May 29, 2024, Otsri stated on Raviv Drucker's television program "Choice Zone" that "the most moral army in the world is no longer moral, and in fact, it is not much of an army anymore. The IDF has transformed from the Israel Defense Forces to an Occupation Police Force in the West Bank."

In October 2024, Otsri was the target of a coordinated online harassment campaign by far-right activists, which included death threats, the distribution of her phone number, and the circulation of an AI-generated sexualized image. Her WhatsApp account was temporarily suspended following mass reports and later reinstated after media coverage.

Otsri has spoken publicly about her belief in the power of art as a form of political resistance, particularly in times of national or social crisis. In a 2024 opinion piece for Haaretz, she wrote:

Art is not only about beauty. In difficult times, it shows people a different, repaired era—and in doing so, allows them to imagine it. It also reminds us of better days. We remember that after forty years in the desert came the Promised Land. That after the Dark Ages came the Renaissance. That after wars came the baby boom. The golden age is still ahead of us. The ability to keep imagining a better reality, even when darkness sets in, gives us a hope that ensures our destiny is not sealed. That our faith in the future hasn’t been lost. That our spiritual grip has not been nullified. That we will not deteriorate, that our bodies and souls will not atrophy. In the struggle for the freedom to imagine, we are not alone. Luckily, our camp is rich with painters, writers, musicians, thinkers, scientists. All these people can help fuel our ability to imagine different lives. We—artists, intellectuals, and writers—have the responsibility to keep creating and to awaken in others the libido for life.

On September 11, 2025, Otsri published an op-ed in Haaretz opposing cultural boycotts of Israeli artists. In the article, she emphasized that Israeli artists have long been at the forefront of opposition to Prime Minister Benjamin Netanyahu and to the occupation, and that silencing them only strengthens authoritarian forces within Israel. She warned that an international boycott would harm independent film and art funds, erode spaces of resistance, and ultimately aid the government's efforts to suppress dissent.

Otsri wrote: "If Israeli artists are silenced, it will mark the end of Israeli democracy. The path of the extremists in government - hungry for blood, determined to prolong the war and to escalate the harm to innocents, even to commit the gravest of war crimes - will be clear of all opposition. There is no greater gift to fascism in Israel."

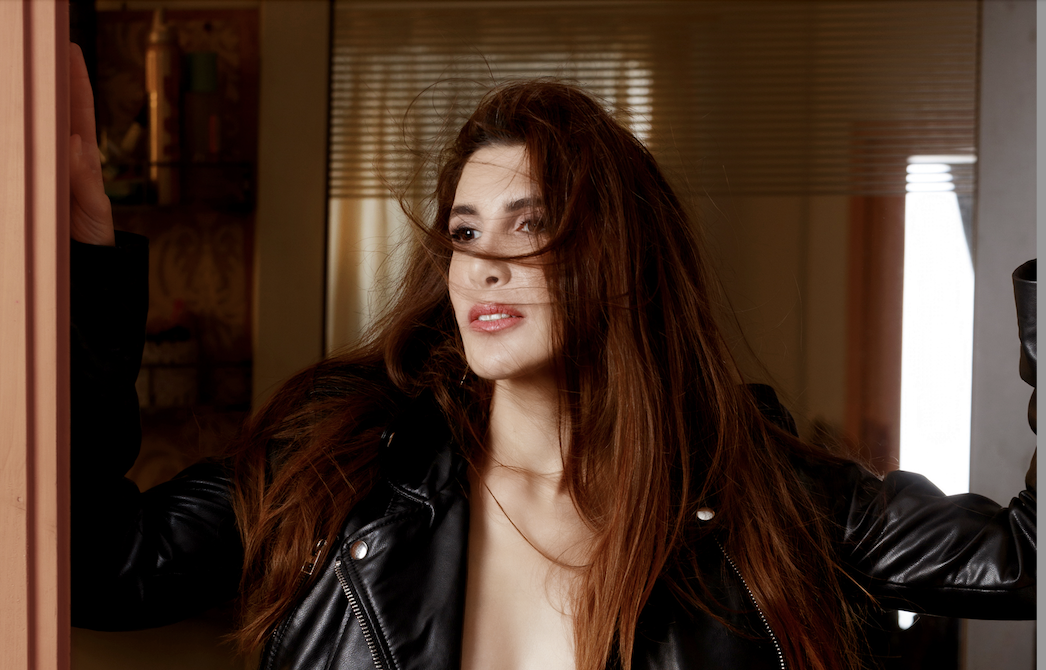

== Literary publications ==
During her literary career, Otsri has published several novels and prose works:

- Shtei HaShemeshoth Shel Dedika (שתי השמשות של דדיקה, 2015, Kinneret Zmora-Bitan Dvir)
- Kotevet HaNeumim (כותבת הנאומים, 2017, Kinneret Zmora-Bitan Dvir)
- Eynayim Adumot (עיניים אדומות, 2019, Kinneret Zmora-Bitan Dvir)
- Hypomania (היפומאניה, 2023, Shtayim Publishing)
- Only We Will Know (ורק אנחנו נדע, Shtayim Publishing)

In addition, Otsri has published works in literary journals:

- Menstruation (וסת, prose) – HaMossach (2020)
- Cartesian Inference (הסקה קרטזיאנית, poetry) – HaMossach (2021)
- Island of Women (אי הנשים, poetry) – Helicon (2021)
- Artemis Young (ארטמיס יאנג, prose) – HaMossach (2023)
- Puddle (שלולית, poetry) – HaMossach (2023)

== Academic publications ==
- Otsri, Magi. "Non-sexist Sexual Humor as Quid Pro Quo Sexual Harassment." Sexuality & Culture 24.1 (2020): 94–112.
- Otsri, Magi. "You Can't Say That: The Effects of Group Affiliation on Morality in Cases of Group Self-Deprecation." Language & Dialogue 10.3 (2020).

Conference papers:

- (June 2016). "'Feminists Have No Sense of Humor': 'Just Joking' as Legal Defense in Cases of Sexual Harassment." Presented at "Gender Crosses Boundaries" Annual Conference, Tel Aviv University, Tel Aviv.
- (June 2016). "The Damage in Breastfeeding under Social Pressure." Presented at the Annual Conference of the Israel Ambulatory Pediatric Association, Tel Aviv.
- (April 2019). "How Offensive is Offensive Humor?" Presented at the 5th Annual Michigan Junior Scholars' Conference, University of Michigan, Ann Arbor.
- (November 2019). "Only Joking as Legal Defense: How offensive is offensive humor?" Presented at the 9th Yale Law School Annual Doctoral Scholarship Conference, Law and Philosophy workshop, Yale University, New Haven.
- (December 2019). "'David Levy Walks Into A Bar': On The Legal Regulation of Offensive Racist Anti-Mizrahi Humor." Presented at the Mizrachi Legal Studies Conference, Harvard University, Cambridge.

== Personal life ==
Otsri lives in Tel Aviv with her partner, writer and screenwriter Adar Meirom, and their daughter. She was diagnosed with bipolar disorder, an experience that has influenced her literary work, particularly her book Hypomania and her forthcoming novel Only We Will Know (ורק אנחנו נדע).
