= IATI =

IATI may refer to:

- Accounting Technicians Ireland, formerly the Institute of Accounting Technicians in Ireland (IATI)
- International Aid Transparency Initiative
- Israel Advanced Technology Industries
