= Montevideo Environmental Law Programme =

UN program aiming to help solve environmental issues

UNEP Montevideo Environmental Law Programme
- Abbreviation: Montevideo Programme
- Formation: 1982
- Type: Programme
- Legal status: Active
- Website: Montevideo Programme

The Montevideo Programme for the Development and Periodic Review of Environmental Law (Montevideo Environmental Law Programme) is a United Nations sequential ten-year intergovernmental program for the development and periodic review of Environmental Law, designed to strengthen the related capacity in countries. The program was conceived in 1982.

The program is based on the three pillars of the Charter of the United Nations which binds peace and security, human rights and development to the rule of law.

UNEP (United Nations Environment Programme) is the Secretariat of the program.

== Objectives ==
In 2019, the United Nations Environment Assembly adopted the Fifth Montevideo Programme, which runs from January 2020 to December 2029, developed to build on the successes of the past programs. The aim is to enable countries to meet the environmental objectives found in United Nations resolutions, in particular, those adopted by the UN Environment Assembly and reflected in multilateral environmental agreements.

In partnership with UN agencies, intergovernmental organizations, civil-society organizations, the private sector, and academics, the program focuses on a number of strategies and activities. These include guidance to develop effective law models, participation and networking among stakeholders and the general public, education and training on environmental law, and research on environmental issues.

The program is to contribute to the environmental dimension of the 2030 Agenda for Sustainable Development. This agenda seeks to strengthen universal peace and the eradication of poverty in order to support sustainable development.

The effective implementation of the fifth program is dependent on the tailoring of clearly defined and achievable activities to the needs and priorities of the particular countries. Activities, for example to achieve sustainable management and use of natural resources and the protection of the environment are to also promote gender equality and intergenerational equity.

Assistance will be invited from academics, experts in the field of environmental law, relevant civil-society organizations and the private sector, where appropriate.

The first global meeting of national focal points, held in 2022, national focal points identified thematic areas for action:

1. Legal responses to address the pollution crisis, including air pollution, waste prevention and mismanagement, and plastic pollution;
2. Legal responses to combat the climate crisis;
3. Legal responses to combat the biodiversity crisis, including enforcement of biodiversity related laws;
4. Access to environmental information, public participation in environmental decision-making and access to justice in environmental matters; and
5. Education and capacity-building related to environmental law, including legal and technical training for national focal points.

== Institutional arrangements ==
Member states can designate national focal points to the Montevideo Programme V. The number of designated national focal points has grown since 2020. National focal points meeting biannually during a global meeting. A registry of national focal points is publicly available on the UNEP-LEAP webpage.

The Montevideo Programme V also has a steering committee for implementation. Steering committees composed of two or three regional representatives will represent the activities at national focal points at the global meetings, and will work with the secretariat in the implementation of the Montevideo Programme.

The Programme adopted a dedicated partnerships and stakeholders strategy in 2024, outlining principles and strategies for enhanced stakeholder engagement.

The programme has a dedicated digital platform called UNEP-LEAP. The platform hosts documents and allows member states to request technical assistance.

== Previous programs ==
Four previous Montevideo Programmes have been implemented:

- Montevideo IV Programme (2010-2019)
- Montevideo III Programme (2000-2009)
- Montevideo II Programme (1990-1999)
- Montevideo I Programme (1981–1990)
