= Rocket Lawyer =

Online legal technology company

Rocket Lawyer, Inc.
- Type: Private Company
- Industry: Legal technology, Internet
- Founded: August 2008; 18 years ago
- Headquarters: 101 Second Street, San Francisco, California
- Key people: Charley Moore, Founder, Executive Chairman and CEO; Mark Edwards, CPO Sumit Malhotra, CTO;
- Products: Attorney Services, Legal Forms, Legal Planning and Local Attorney Listings
- Number of employees: 375
- Website: www.rocketlawyer.com, www.rocketlawyer.co.uk

Rocket Lawyer is an online legal technology company founded by Charley Moore in 2008 and based in San Francisco, California. It provides individuals and small to medium-sized businesses with online legal services—including incorporation, estate plans, and legal document review. The company also provides a network of attorneys that consumers and small businesses can consult with on legal issues through its On Call service. In 2012, Rocket Lawyer UK was launched.

== History ==
=== Beginnings ===
In 1996, Moore graduated from UC Berkeley School of Law and began his career as an attorney at Venture Law Group where he participated in the early-stage representation of Yahoo! and Web TV. In 1998, he founded OnStation Corporation to provide software to the automotive industry. Then, in 2008, he founded Rocket Lawyer to provide an affordable way for companies to access legal advice. Moore's idea for Rocket Lawyer was to create an easy-to-use platform where legal documents could be created and shared by everyone. In 2009, he sold his company, OnStation Corp, and used the money from the sale to grow Rocket Lawyer.

From the beginning, the company has targeted entrepreneurs; its initial sales model offered a basic plan and a pro plan, both of which charged entrepreneurs for individual legal documents at a lower cost than standard attorney rates. Under the basic plan, the company provided interactive legal templates and step-by-step instructions to help businesses. The pro plan gave customers access to consultations, document review, and legal representation from local attorneys.

After the late-2000s recession, Rocket Lawyer switched to a monthly subscription-based model to increase sales. After making this change, Rocket Lawyer increased its annual revenue from $1 million in 2008 to $5 million in 2009, and increased its monthly visitors from 150,000 to 900,000 over the same period.

=== Growth ===
In January 2009, Rocket Lawyer raised $2 million from LexisNexis and appointed LexisNexis executive Ralph Calistri to its board. In December 2009, Dan Nye, the former CEO of LinkedIn, joined Rocket Lawyer's board of directors. After a few months as a board member, Nye was named president and CEO. This allowed Moore to transition to Executive Chairman. Nye focused on improving Rocket Lawyer's customer service and utilizing an analytical approach to new products, including allowing customers to create free legal documents. This helped Rocket Lawyer boost new accounts from tens of thousands a month to over 100,000 a month.

In 2010, Rocket Lawyer received $7 million in equity financing from Investor Growth Capital Limited, to expand its operations. In July 2011, the company raised $18.5 million in a Series D round of financing from August Capital, Google Ventures and Investor Growth Capital. Five months later, in December 2011, Rocket Lawyer raised an additional $10.79 million from Industry Ventures, bringing its total funding to $43 million. By 2011, Rocket Lawyer reached $20 million in annual revenue.

In 2012, Rocket Lawyer launched in the UK, and then in 2016 it launched in continental Europe in partnership with the French legal publisher Éditions Lefebvre Sarrut, a direct competitor of Rocket Lawyer's lead seed investor LexisNexis.

In January 2013, the company acquired LawPivot, a legal question-and-answer service. From October 2015 to January 2016, Rocket Lawyer partnered with the American Bar Association (ABA) on a pilot project designed to help consumers find lawyers and attorneys find business. Information from the project was used to help the ABA with potential future Law Connect programs.

In September 2018, Rocket Lawyer started integrating blockchain technology into its legal transactions in order to provide “smart contracts” for its clients. The service was beta-tested in 2018, and offered commercially starting in 2019. Under the new service, called Rocket Wallet, contracts are secured and executed automatically with blockchain encryption technology. Rocket Lawyer works with the blockchain company ConsenSys and OpenLaw to provide Rocket Wallet.

In 2018, Rocket Lawyer UK received a waiver from the Solicitors Regulation Authority (SRA) to allow practicing solicitors to advise Rocket Lawyer's clients. In 2017, the SRA had approved a rule change to allow solicitors to practice from unregulated firms. Because the rule was not introduced until 2019, the SRA offered waivers to qualifying companies in the meantime.

Rocket Lawyer created the COViD-19 Legal Center in April 2020, with free advice, information, and legal documents for business owners during the pandemic. It provided a worksheet to help owners determine what benefits and loans they were eligible for. In September, it became the first national company to be approved by the Utah Supreme Court to participate in the state's "regulatory sandbox", a seven-year pilot program for non-lawyer ownership of legal services.

== Services ==
=== Online services ===
Rocket Lawyer provides online legal services for individuals and small to medium-sized businesses ranging from prenuptial agreements to incorporating businesses. The online legal services are available to Rocket Lawyer account holders, and give access to online legal forms, help articles, and also extend to discounts with local attorneys. Rocket Lawyer's online database of legal forms was the original premise of the company, and has since expanded to include various other services.

=== Attorney services ===
In addition to the do it yourself legal services, Rocket Lawyer offers consumers and businesses access to a network of lawyers who can review customers' legal documents, answer questions, and provide other legal services. For example, if a user needs assistance in creating or editing a legal document, he or she can be connected directly to a local attorney who can provide guidance.

=== Legal Health Score ===
In 2008, Rocket Lawyer introduced Legal Health Score, which helps individuals and businesses understand their level of legal wellness. The score, which is a number between 1 and 100, is based on considerations like whether a business has incorporated or whether legal contracts are in writing. Rocket Lawyer then provides both a step-by-step walk through of all the basics needed to improve a user's legal heath and a detailed action plan that companies can follow to remedy any legal vulnerabilities. Rocket Lawyer offers the Legal Health Score service to all types of accounts.

== Competitors ==
As of 2017, LegalZoom is Rocket Lawyer's primary Internet-based competitor in the U.S. market for legal form documents. A personal finance article in USA Today stated the common perception that both LegalZoom and Rocket Lawyer allow consumers to save money on legal fees but also require some self-education and legal legwork.

Rocket Lawyer's competitors also include Nolo (formerly Nolo Press), a publisher of do-it-yourself legal guides and the creator of Quicken WillMaker software.

== See also ==
- eLawyering
