= Brian Liu =

American lawyer and entrepreneur

Brian P.Y. Liu (born 1967) is an American lawyer who is a co-founder of LegalZoom, and the founder of BizCounsel and Overture Law.

He was born in Taipei, Taiwan and moved to Bellevue, Washington at the age of 5. Liu graduated with a B.S. from UC Berkeley and earned his J.D. from UCLA School of Law in 1996. He began his career in corporate law at Sullivan & Cromwell, where he specialized in IPOs and mergers & acquisitions. He later moved to an in-house legal role at Oaktree Capital Management, a global investment firm.

He conceived LegalZoom in 1999 after planning it with Brian Lee, his college friend from UCLA Law School. Their goal was to create an online resource that would make basic legal resources available to anyone through the Internet.

He launched the company in 2001 with Robert Shapiro, Edward Hartman and his friend Brian Lee, whom he met at UCLA Law School. Liu and Lee started the company from their own funds. Liu was chief executive officer of LegalZoom until 2007 and chairman until 2018.
