= Cappelletti (disambiguation) =

Cappelletti is a type of pasta.

Cappelletti may also refer to:

- Cappelletti (surname), including a list of people with the surname
- Cappelletti convention, a bidding convention in contract bridge
- Cappelletti (distillery), a liqueur manufacturer
- Cappelletti (cavalry), Dalmatian mercenaries in 15th to 18th century Venice

== See also ==
- Cappelletto (disambiguation)
