= Mark Lemley =

American legal scholar

Mark A. Lemley

Academic background
- Education: Stanford University (BA); University of California, Berkeley (JD)

Academic work
- Discipline: Intellectual property law
- Sub-discipline: Patent law, Trademark law, Copyright law, Antitrust law, Computer law
- Institutions: Stanford Law School

Mark A. Lemley (born c. 1966) is an American legal scholar known for his studies of American intellectual property law. He is currently the William H. Neukom Professor of Law at Stanford Law School and the Director of the Stanford Law School Program in Law, Science & Technology. Lemley is a founding partner of the law firm of Durie Tangri LLP, which he has been practicing with since 2009.

== Early life and education ==
Lemley graduated from Stanford University in 1988 with a Bachelor of Arts in economics and political science. As an undergraduate at Stanford, he was a Truman Scholar. He then attended the University of California Berkeley School of Law, where he was an articles editor for the California Law Review. He graduated in 1991, ranked first in his class, with a Juris Doctor degree with membership in the Order of the Coif. After law school, he served as a law clerk to Judge Dorothy Wright Nelson of the U.S. Court of Appeals for the Ninth Circuit from 1991 to 1992.

== Career ==
=== Academic career ===
Lemley teaches intellectual property, computer and Internet law, patent law, trademark law, antitrust law and remedies at Stanford Law School. He is the author of eleven books, including the two-volume treatise IP and Antitrust, and over 200 articles published in law reviews or law journals. He is a widely cited expert on patent law. According to his official biography on the Stanford Law website, his works "have been cited more than 220 times by courts, including eleven United States Supreme Court opinions, and more than 14,000 times in books and law review articles, making him the most-cited scholar in IP law and one of the five most cited legal scholars of all time" and he has also "published 9 of the 100 most-cited law review articles of the last twenty years."

Prior to Stanford Law, where he has been teaching since 2004, he taught law at University of Texas School of Law (1994–2000) as The Marrs McLean Professor of Law and UC Berkeley School of Law (2000–2004) as The Elizabeth Josselyn Boalt Professor of Law.

=== Private practice ===
Lemley also practices law at Lex Lumina PLLC. From 2009 to 2022, he practiced law as a partner at Durie Tangri LLP, which he co-founded. Before his academic career, Lemley practiced law with the firms of Brown and Bain as well as Fish and Richardson. Lemley, who had represented Meta Platforms in a 2023 AI copyright case, dropped the company as a client in January 2025, accusing CEO Mark Zuckerberg of falling into a "descent into toxic masculinity and Neo-Nazi madness."

=== Business ===
Lemley is one of the founders of Lex Machina, a company that provides data analytics involving IP and antitrust litigation to law firms, universities, courts, and policymakers. The company started as a public interest project by Lemley and co-founders George Gregory and Joshua Walker at Stanford University's Law School and Computer Science department, under the IP Clearinghouse Project.

== Awards ==
Lemley has been named California Lawyer's Attorney of the Year twice (in 2005 and 2015) and received the California State Bar's inaugural IP Vanguard Award. In 2007, he was named a Young Global Leader by the Davos World Francisco IP lawyer of the year and Best Lawyers' San Francisco IP Lawyer of the Year in 2010. Lemley was inducted in the 2014 IP Hall of Fame. In 2017, he received the P.J. Federico Award from the Patent and Trademark Office Society. In 2018, Lemley received the World Technology Award for Law. He has been recognized as one of the 25 most influential people in IP by American Lawyer, one of the 100 most influential lawyers in the National Law Journal (in 2006 and 2013), and one of the 10 most admired attorneys in IP by IP360. In 2007, Lemley was recognized as one of the top 50 litigators in the country under 45.

== Publications ==
Lemley is the author of 11 books and over 200 articles, including the two-volume treatise IP and Antitrust. His articles have appeared in 24 of the top 25 law reviews, in economic journals such as the American Economic Review and the Review of Economics and Statistics. Lemley published 9 of the 100 most-cited law review articles in the last twenty years, more than any other scholar.

=== Selected articles ===
- Lemley, Mark A. (1997). "The Economics of Improvement in Intellectual Property Law". Texas Law Review. 75 (5): 989–1084.
- —; McGowan, David (1998). "Legal Implications of Network Economic Effects". California Law Review. 86 (3): 479–612.
- —; Allison, John R. (1998). "Empirical Evidence on the Validity of Litigated Patents". AIPLA Quarterly Journal. 26 (3): 185–276.
- —; Volokh, Eugene (1998). "Freedom of Speech and Injunctions in Intellectual Property Cases". Duke Law Journal. 48 (2): 147–242.
- — (1999). "The Modern Lanham Act and the Death of Common Sense". Yale Law Journal. 108 (7): 1687–1716.
- — (2001). "Rational Ignorance at the Patent Office". Northwestern University Law Review. 95 (4): 1495–1532.
- — (2002). "Intellectual Property Rights and Standard-Setting Organizations". California Law Review. 90 (6): 1889–1980.
- —; Burk, Dan L. (2003). "Policy Levers in Patent Law". Virginia Law Review. 89 (7): 1575–1696.
- —; Hovenkamp, Herbert; Janis, Mark (2003). "Anticompetitive Settlements of Intellectual Property Disputes". Minnesota Law Review. 87 (6): 1719–66. Archived from the original on October 7, 2017.
- —; Shapiro, Carl (2005). "Probabilistic Patents". Journal of Economic Perspectives. 19 (2): 75–98. doi:10.1257/0895330054048650.
- — (2005). "Property, Intellectual Property, and Free Riding". Texas Law Review. 83 (4): 1031–76.
- — (2007). "Patent Holdup and Royalty Stacking". Texas Law Review. 85 (7): 1991–2050.
