= Cappelletto =

Cappelletto is a surname. Notable people with the surname include:

- Brian Cappelletto (born 1969), American Scrabble player
- Paolo Cappelletto, Roman Catholic prelate who served as Bishop of Lacedonia

== See also ==
- Cappelletti (disambiguation)
- Cappelletto, village in Santa Maria a Monte, Italy
