= Lex Machina =

Intellectual property litigation research company

Lex Machina, Inc.
- Industry: Legal analytics, legal technology
- Headquarters: Menlo Park, California
- Key people: Carla Rydholm, General Manager and Head of Product; Joshua Walker, Co-founder; George Gregory, Co-founder
- Products: Signature Block Analyzer; Attorney Data Engine
- Services: Legal analytics research platform
- Owner: LexisNexis
- Number of employees: 150
- Website: lexmachina.com

Lex Machina, Inc. is a company that provides legal analytics to legal professionals. It began as an IP litigation research company and is now a division of LexisNexis. The company started as a project at Stanford University within the university's law school and computer science department before launching as a startup in Menlo Park, California. Lex Machina provides a SaaS product to legal professionals to aid in their practice, research, and business.

== History ==
Lex Machina initially began in 2006 as a public interest project at Stanford University by Professor Mark Lemley and co-founders George Gregory and Joshua Walker. The project was developed within the university's law school and computer science department under the IP Litigation Clearinghouse (IPLC) project. Lex Machina was incorporated in 2008 and launched the following year. The name "Lex Machina" is a Latin phrase meaning "law machine" that Walker had used in a research paper he wrote in 2004. Walker was named the CEO of the company until venture capitalist Josh Becker took over in 2011. In 2015 the company was acquired by LexisNexis. Former CTO Karl Harris became CEO of Lex Machina in 2018. In 2024, Carla Rydholm became General Manager of Lex Machina.

== Company developments ==
Lex Machina is based in Menlo Park, just north of Palo Alto and Stanford. While still a public interest project at Stanford, Lex Machina generated approximately $3 million in donations. In 2012, the company reportedly received $2 million in funding led by X/Seed Capital Management. Lex Machina generated another $4.8 million in a Series A round of funding in 2013 led by Cue Ball Capital. LexisNexis acquired Lex Machina in 2015.

== Services ==
Lex Machina is a legal analytics solution that uses artificial intelligence and technology-assisted human review to deliver case resolutions, damages, remedies, findings, and accurate counsel and party data. Its engineering processes acquire and maintain a constantly updating database of case data and documents necessary to provide accurate data. Lex Machina gathers raw information from cases, including downloading millions of court documents, to present the comprehensive and accurate data. It cleans, tags, codes, enhances, and presents the resulting data in a way that makes it easy for legal professionals to access insights and grasp trends that are relevant to a specific legal matter.

Lex Machina currently provides legal analytics on any federal commercially relevant civil court case in 22 practice areas, as well as enhanced analytics on civil cases in over 100 state courts and key data on civil cases in over 1,300 state courts. The services Lex Machina provides can be used within a variety of industries, and the company has clients ranging from law firms (including over 80% of the AmLaw 100) to companies (including Meta, Nike, and Microsoft). Lex Machina allows qualifying public-interest entities to access its services for free.
