= Judicial Innovation Fellowship =

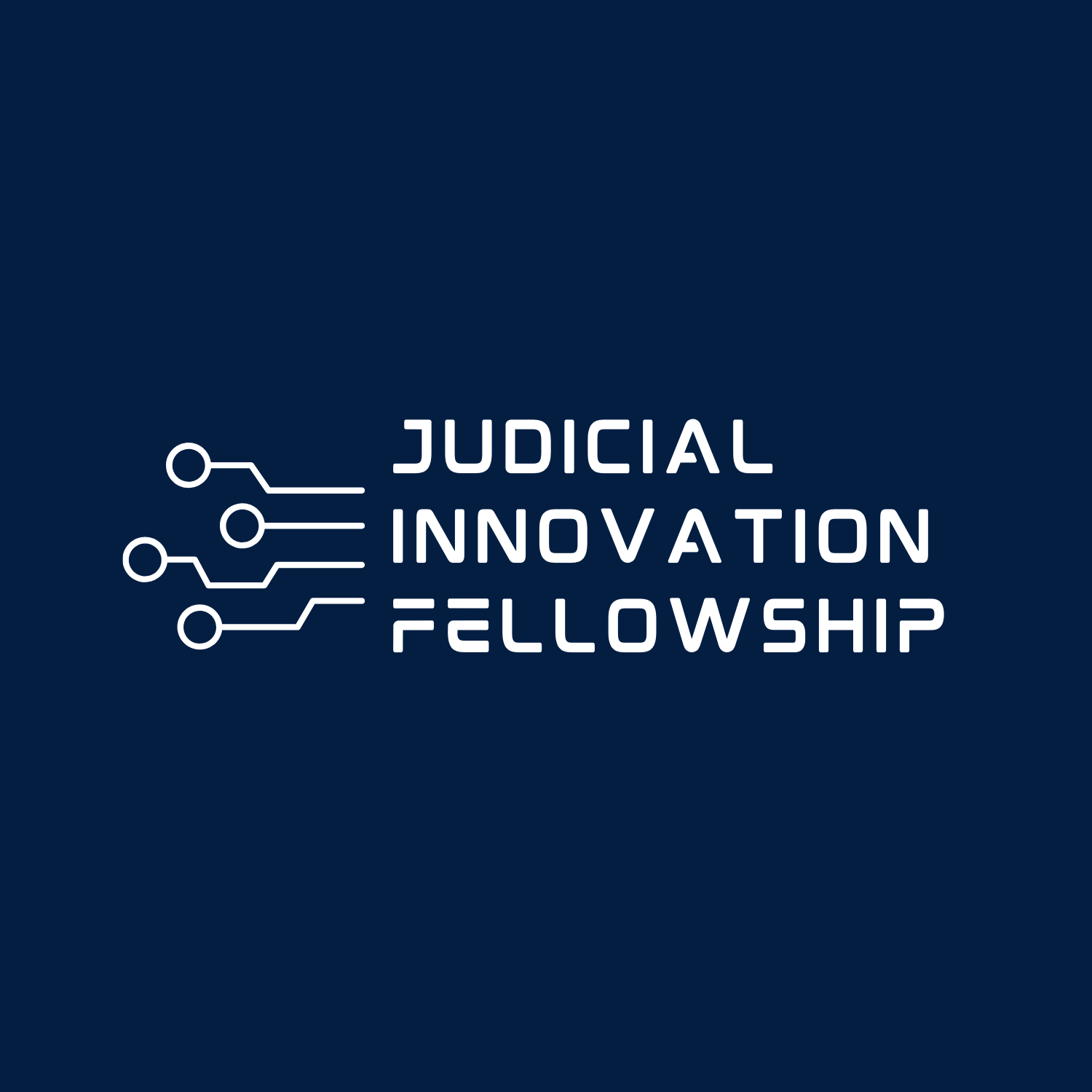
Judicial Innovation Fellowship Logo

The Judicial Innovation Fellowship' is a technology policy fellowship that places technologists in state, local, tribal and territorial courts. Tech experts and professionals spend one year with a court focused on improving court administration to the benefit of the public. An access to justice program, the projects JIF (pronounced "Jif", like the peanut butter) fellows focus on helping court modernize their technical infrastructure, process, and design of public facing websites and tools that are built for people who cannot afford an attorney. The program is piloted at the Institute for Technology Law and Policy at Georgetown Law.

== Background ==
The program was initially proposed in 2022 as a Day One proposal published by the Federation of American Scientists and written by Cori Zarek, Miguel Willis, Jameson Dempsey, Tanina Rostain, and Jason Tashea. Originally, the authors proposed that "Congress should create and fund a Judicial Innovation Fellowship that brings experienced technologists and service designers into state, tribal, and federal courts to improve judicial administration, transparency, and access to justice, like programs in the U.S. federal executive and legislative branches (such as the United States Digital Service and TechCongress)." Congress did not create the program. Instead, the program was seeded by the New Venture Fund with supplemental funding provided by the Pew Charitable Trusts, the State Justice Institute, and the Utah Bar Foundation. JIF co-founder Jason Tashea was made the founding director in 2023.

== Logistics ==
JIF published a "roadmap" based on over 100 interviews with experts in justice sector reform, government technology, and fellowship programs. The document identified common pain points experienced by courts across the United States, including the need for improved user-centered design, cybersecurity, data infrastructure, and calendaring and scheduling.

In 2023, JIF launched a national call for proposals and fellows. Three pilot sites were chosen, which each received a fellow with a skillset pertinent to the project. Some fellows had hybrid placements, while others worked full-time in their courts. Fellows are employees of Georgetown Law and received salaries between $85,000 and $95,000.

== Projects ==
For its first cohort of fellows, JIF placed three fellows across three courts. Those courts were the Utah State Courts, the Kansas State Courts, and the Hamilton County, Tennessee General Sessions Court. The projects in Utah and Kansas focused on bringing user-centered design to public-facing, online tools developed by the courts, like electronic court filing. In Hamilton County, the project focused on improving court data infrastructure and software documentation regarding both civil and criminal legal case management.

== Impact ==
In fall of 2024, JIF released a report on the impact and feasibility of a technology fellowship program in courts. The purpose of the pilot, according to the report, was to discern if courts want to participate in a program like JIF; if technologists and designers want to work in courts; and to know if anything good would happen if a program brought courts and technologists together. The program reports an "unequivocal 'yes'" to each of these key issues.

"Among other accomplishments, our three fellows redesigned court forms that were then approved for official use; improved usability of data systems to decrease input errors; and inspired a court to develop a tool in house, instead of relying on a subpar, out-of-house vendor. In one instance, proving the long-term and unique value of talent not usually hired by courts, one court offered to create a new position to retain their JIF fellow. And in all three courts, our fellows voluntarily offered to provide support to their courts after the end of the fellowship."

Even with these successes, the report outlines other challenges. Notably, the authors indicate a paradox about JIF, chiefly that, "[a] program like JIF is simultaneously too big and too small to succeed in the current environment." Meaning that each fellow placement costs approximately $195,000, making it hard to find sustainable funding. By contrast, "there are between 5,000-10,000 courts in the United States. Even if we increased funding by one hundred fold, to $120 million a year, allowing us to place 300 fellows a year, it would take us between 16.5 and 33.3 years to place one fellow in every court. Thus, making us too small for the scope of the problem."

The report ends by saying the future of the program is unclear and that the co-founders will spend time thinking about the lessons learned from the experience.
