= MyJustice =

- Formation: 2015
- Type: NGO
- Legal status: Active
- Purpose: Deepening access to justice in Myanmar
- Location: Myanmar
- Website: Official website

MyJustice is a European Union-funded access to justice initiative, which aims to equip the people of Myanmar with the knowledge, confidence and opportunities to resolve conflicts fairly, equitably and justly. The project was set up to address the flaws in the country's justice system, a legacy of decades of colonial and military rule that is among the many challenges facing Myanmar as it opens up and transitions to a civilian government - amid concern that the jjudiciary lacks independence from military or political control, and disputes over land ownership and labour laws a particular problem. Setting up "justice centres" to improve access to justice by offering free legal advice to low-income and marginalised people, and the first centres opened in Yangon and Mawlamyine (the Capital of Mon State) in 2015. They have also been involved in projects relating to the introduction of legal aid and training. In 2017 they had provided legal representation to over 2,400 clients and legal advice to over 1,400 others, and opened centres in Mandalay and Taunggyi (the Shan State capital). In 2018 expanding and opening more centres in Hpa-an, Bago and Naypyitaw. In 2020 they linked up with the Scottish Faculty of Advocates to learn how the Scottish criminal justice system has adapted to the COVID-19 pandemic, and to get assistance in training and capacity building of the Myanmar legal community.
