= Cori Zarek =

U.S. official

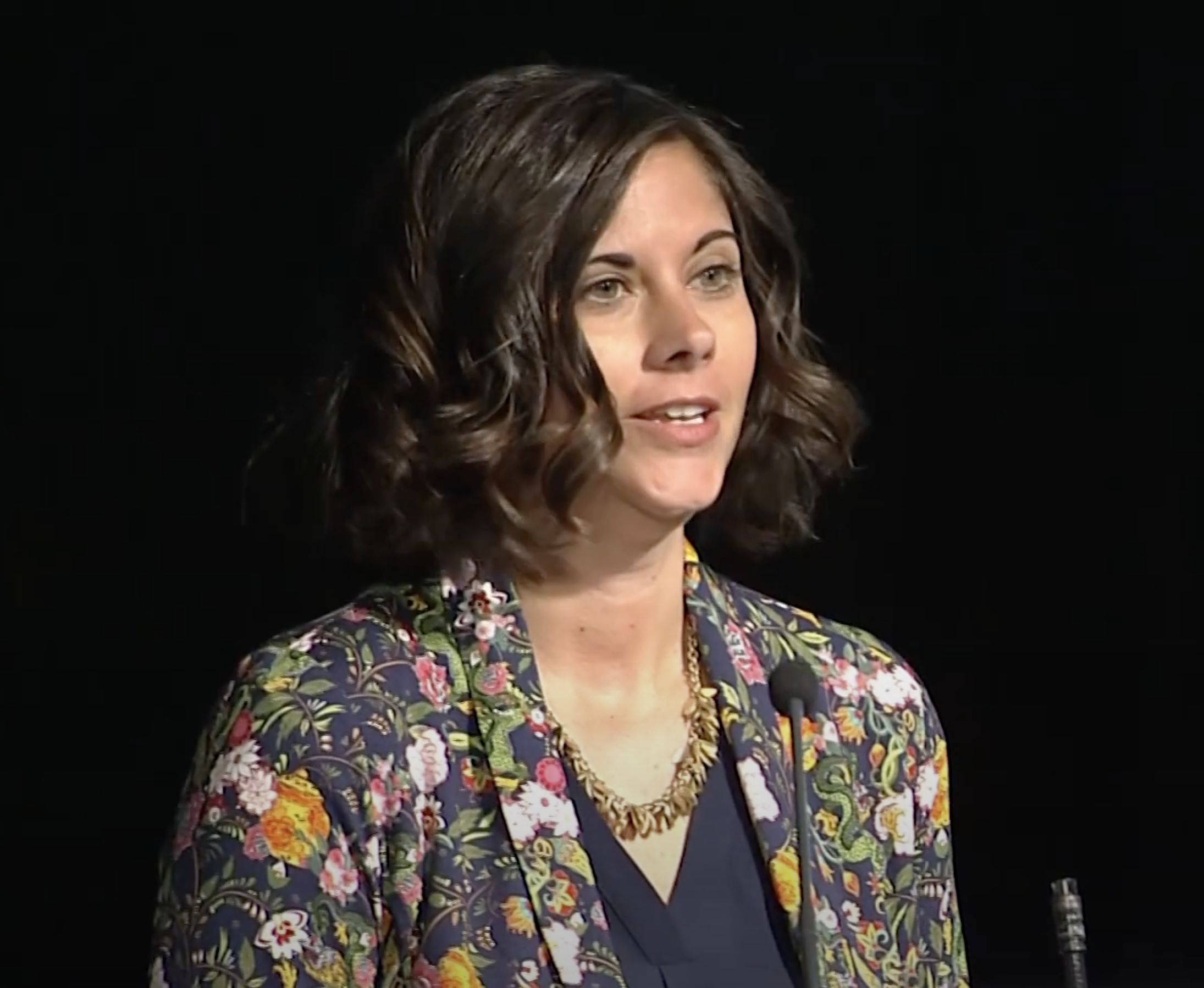
- Zarek speaking at AGL Summit East, 2019

Deputy Chief Technology Officer of the United States
- In office April 2016 – March 2017
- President: Barack Obama
- Preceded by: Ryan Panchadsaram

Personal details
- Education: University of Iowa (BA); University of Iowa College of Law (JD)

Corinna "Cori" Zarek is an American lawyer, public interest technologist and adjunct professor of media law.

In August 2022, Zarek was appointed as the 3rd Deputy Administrator of the United States Digital Service at the White House. Zarek was the Executive Director of the Beeck Center for Social Impact and Innovation at Georgetown University, where she formerly was the Director of Data + Digital. She served as Deputy United States Chief Technology Officer (CTO) at the White House with the third CTO Megan Smith and as the Senior Advisor for Open Government to the second CTO Todd Park. She led the team's work to build a more digital, open, and collaborative government. Currently, she is on the board of directors of MuckRock, member of the advisory board for the International Center for Not-for-Profit Law, and member of the professional advisory board for the University of Iowa School of Journalism and Mass Communication. In 2020, Zarek co-founded the United States Digital Response, a collection of rapidly deployed pro-bono technology teams created in response to acute government needs during the COVID crisis. In 2022, while still at Georgetown, Zarek co-founded the Judicial Innovation Fellowship.

In 2016, Zarek was inducted into the U.S. Freedom of Information Hall of Fame for her contributions to the FOIA community.

== Early Career and Education ==
From 2009 to 2013, Zarek was a founding member of the Office of Government Information Services, the office created in the 2007 amendments to the Freedom of Information Act (FOIA) to serve as a FOIA ombudsman. From 2008 to 2009, she was the Freedom of Information Director and legal fellow for the Reporters Committee for Freedom of the Press where she worked on free press, free expression, and freedom of information issues. One notable case she worked on included ACLU v. Department of Defense, the litigation to release images of prisoner abuse at Iraq's Abu Ghraib prison, where she led the amicus curiae effort for the Reporters Committee for Freedom of the Press and 16 news media organizations in filing a brief in the U.S. Court of Appeals for the Second Circuit and a further brief in the Supreme Court of the United States.

In 2000, Zarek was named Editor-in-Chief of The Daily Iowan, the student-run newspaper at the University of Iowa for the school year 2000–2001. She led the newspaper to receive the 2001 Pacemaker Award for excellence in college journalism.

Zarek holds a B.A. from the University of Iowa College of Liberal Arts and J.D from the University of Iowa College of Law.

== Career ==
Zarek's work spans policy, practice, technology, and transparency. Most recently, she was the Senior Fellow at Mozilla leading the Tech Policy Fellows team, where her work focused on the intersection of tech policy and transparency. Zarek was attorney at the National Archives and Records Administration. Zarek also coordinates U.S. involvement with the global Open Government Partnership, a 70-country platform driving greater transparency and accountability around the world. Since 2007, Zarek has taught at American University, Arizona State University and the University of Maryland. She currently teaches at San Francisco State University.

Zarek has also served as an expert in the U.S. Speaker Program with the U.S. Department of State where she has engaged with government and civil society to provide technical support on freedom of the press, freedom of information, open data, open government, anti-corruption efforts, whistleblower protection, and civic technology. She has carried out programs in Togo, Tunisia, Seychelles, Mauritius, Sri Lanka, and Maldives.

== Honors ==
- In 2016, the Freedom Forum named Zarek to the National Freedom of Information Hall of Fame.
- In 2016, Thomas Jefferson High School inducted Zarek into its Hall of Fame.
- In 2014, the University of Iowa named Zarek an Alumni Fellow in its College of Liberal Arts and Sciences.
- In 2009, the National Press Club bestowed Zarek with the Vivian Award for volunteer service to the club.
