= Cappelletti (surname) =

Cappelletti is a surname. Notable people with the surname include:

- Amanda Cappelletti (born 1986), American politician and lawyer
- Ángel Cappelletti (1927–1995), Argentine professor
- Conner Cappelletti (born 1989), association football coach and former player
- Daniel Cappelletti (born 1991), Italian footballer
- Francesca Cappelletti (born 1964), Italian art history professor
- Felice Cappelletti (1656–1738), Italian painter
- Gino Cappelletti (1934–2022), American football player
- Giuseppe Cappelletti, 19th-century scholar of Armenia and Venice including the Doge's Palace
- John Cappelletti (born 1952), American football running back
- Loredana Cappelletti (1942–2006), Italian actress and model
- Mike Cappelletti (1942–2013), American bridge player and poker authority
- Norma Cappelletti (1925–2014), American politician
- Vincenzo Cappelletti (1930–2020, in Rome), Italian philosopher and historian of science

== See also ==
- Cappelletti (disambiguation)
