= Alfred Witkon =

Israeli jurist

- אלפרד ויתקון
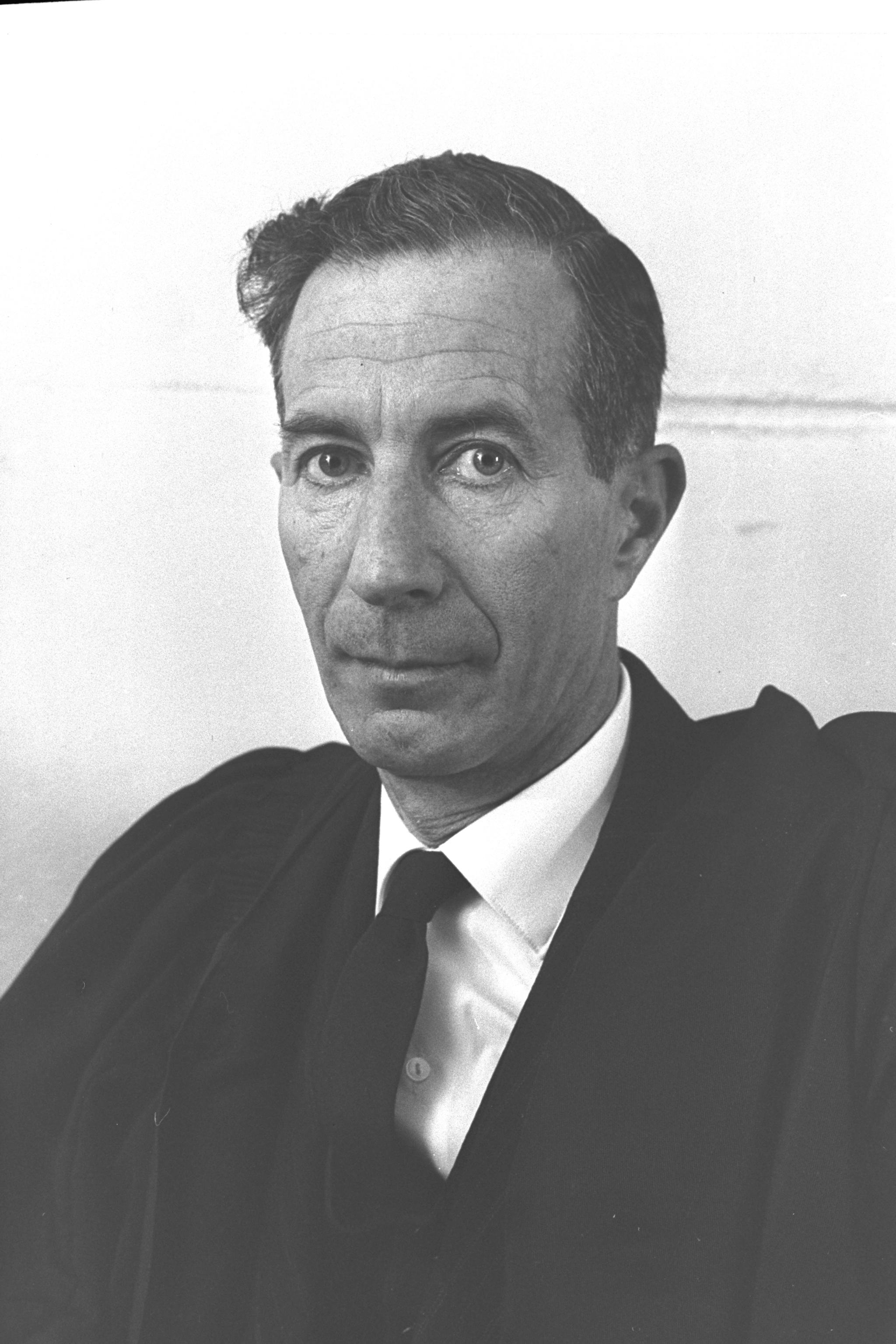
- Born: February 23, 1910; Berlin, Germany
- Died: May 20, 1984 (aged 74)
- Education: University of Berlin, University of Bonn, University of Freiburg
- Occupations: Jurist, Judge
- Years active: 1937–1980
- Known for: Judge on the Supreme Court of Israel
- Spouse: Greta Philipson (married 1936)
- Children: Naomi and Gideon

Alfred Witkon (Hebrew: אלפרד ויתקון; February 23, 1910 – May 20, 1984) was an Israeli jurist who served as a judge on the Supreme Court of Israel.

== Biography ==
Witkon was born to a wealthy Jewish family in Berlin, Germany. He studied law at the University of Berlin, University of Bonn, and the University of Freiburg, from which he earned a JD. He immigrated to Mandatory Palestine in 1935. His two brothers also immigrated to Palestine. He settled in Jerusalem and in 1936 married Greta Philipson, with whom he had two children, Naomi and Gideon.

== Legal career ==
Witkon was called to the Middle Temple Bar in 1936 and to the Palestine Bar in 1937. From 1937 to 1948, Witkon was a lawyer in private practice in Palestine. He worked as an attorney for S. Horowitz & Co., one of the country's most prestigious law firms. Upon Israeli independence in 1948, Witkon became a judge and was appointed President of the Jerusalem District Court. In 1951, he was appointed to be a temporary judge on the Israeli Supreme Court, and his appointment was made permanent in 1954. Witkon was considered the court's premier expert on tax law. He served as a lecturer on tax law at the Hebrew University of Jerusalem and authored a book on Israeli tax law that is considered one of the foundational texts on the topic in Israel.

Witkon was one of the Supreme Court judges who heard Adolf Eichmann's appeal in 1962. He chaired the Central Elections Committee during the 1969 Israeli legislative election. He retired from the bench in 1980 upon reaching the mandatory retirement age.
