= General counsel =

Chief lawyer of a legal department

A general counsel (often abbreviated to GC), also known as chief counsel or chief legal officer (CLO), is the chief in-house lawyer inside a company, governmental department, charity, not-for-profit organization, or institution.

The person holding the position typically reports directly to the CEO or equivalent, and their duties involve identifying and overseeing the legal issues in all departments and their interrelation, including production, operations, engineering, design, IT, marketing, sales, distribution, customer service, complaints, credit, finance and human resources, as well as corporate governance and business policy. As the GC/CLO is expected to be familiar with and advise on the business at the most confidential level, the role naturally requires in most cases reporting directly to the owner or CEO overseeing the whole business. It also requires the GC/CLO to work closely with each of the other officers, and their departments, to appropriately be aware and advise.

Historically, in the early to mid-20th Century, general counsel often handled more administrative tasks while outsourcing more complex legal work to outside lawyers in private practice. Since the 1980s, however, the general counsel position has become increasingly prominent in companies and other organisations as the main legal adviser to the board of directors on major and complex matters, replacing the need for outside lawyers. GCs are no longer back-office figures: rather they are strategic partners at the heart of the organisation, bringing not only legal expertise but also commercial foresight, and enabling growth and resilience.

General counsel often have broad roles encompassing strategic advice, crisis management and public policy advocacy. Many companies' general counsel, and the teams of in-house counsel they lead, also handle specialized tasks such as tax work, mergers and acquisitions, labor law, insurance and intellectual property, sometimes building in-house legal practice groups that rival the practices of major law firms.

General counsel are now often among the most highly paid executives of major American corporations, with many earning seven-figure or eight-figure compensation packages. Prominent American government lawyers and law firm partners may be hired for general counsel roles at prominent companies; or alternatively lawyers may have built their career in-house, progressing through roles such as legal counsel, senior legal counsel, and assistant/deputy general counsel before stepping into the GC/CLO position. Similar trends are also being seen in the United Kingdom and other countries.

== Organizations ==
=== United States ===
==== The General Counsel Forum ====
The Forum is an association of 700 general counsel and senior managing counsel. The non-profit organization was founded in the fall of 1998 as the Dallas-Fort Worth General Counsel's Management Practices Forum (“DFWGCMPF”). The association is a partnership between in-house members and outside counsel, known as underwriters. Members are general counsel and managing counsel of corporations, non-profit organizations and government agencies. The mission of the Forum is to improve the professional lives of general counsel and managing counsel through meaningful opportunities for peer-to-peer interaction and knowledge exchange, mentoring through professional development in legal best practices, ethics, governance, and compliance. In November 2000, the DFWGCMPF changed its name to The Texas General Counsel Forum, also known as The Forum, and in the following year the Houston Chapter was formed, and then the Austin-San Antonio Chapter was founded. In July 2005, the Forum hired a chief executive officer with the mandate to improve the efficiency and effectiveness of the organization, expand membership, and launch the organization nationally. In November 2009, the board of directors approved expanding the Forum nationally, and dropped the reference to Texas, becoming simply The General Counsel Forum. In the fall of 2012, the General Counsel Forum founded the Chicago Chapter.

==== Salary ====
In the United States, lawyers working directly on the payroll of governments, nonprofits, and in-house lawyers working for corporations all usually earn a regular annual salary. The salaries vary depending on specific job positions, employment environment, lawyer expertise, among other factors. As of 2024, the median salary for in-house lawyers was $274,000. That year saw a 4.4% surge in salary with cash bonuses paid at 95% of targets met, according to an annual survey of in-house lawyer compensation. This surge outpaced American inflation for that year, which was at 4.1%. As of 2026, the average base salary of in-house counsel was $173,515, roughly translating into an hourly rate of $83 per hour. On average, an entry-level in-house counsel lawyer with 1-3 years of experience earns an average of $119,681, while senior-level in-house counsel with over 8 years of experience earn an average salary of $198,949. Average bonuses are estimated to be $11,452 per year.

=== United Kingdom ===
In the United Kingdom a group of general counsel, called the GC100, was officially launched on 9 March 2005 and brings together the senior legal officers of more than eighty-five FTSE 100 companies. The GC100 group was created in response to the increasing volume and complexity of domestic and international law and regulation which impacts on UK listed companies. The group was formed with the support of Practical Law Company which acts as its secretariat.

The main objectives of the GC100 are to:

- Provide a forum for practical and business focused input on key areas of legislative and policy reform common to UK listed companies.
- Enable members to share best practice in relation to law, risk management, compliance and other areas of common interest.

Membership of the GC100 is by invitation only. At the AGM on the 16 January 2007 members voted in favour of extending membership to company secretaries as well as general counsel in the FTSE 100. The formal name of the GC100 is now "The Association of General Counsel and Company Secretaries of the FTSE100", although it will continue to be known as the GC100.

Mark Harding, the first chair of the GC100, has stated that the GC100 is not a campaigning body, although they work closely with the FD100 (a similar grouping of blue chip finance directors).

== See also ==
- Corporate lawyer
- Corporation counsel
- Enterprise legal management
