= Israel Advanced Technology Industries =

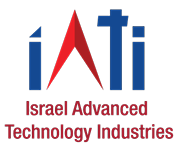
- Founded: 2012; 14 years ago
- Type: Non-Profit Corporation
- Purpose: High tech Life sciences
- Location: Israel
- CEO: Karin Mayer Rubinstein
- Chairman: Erez Tsur; Yaacov Michlin
- Website: iati.co.il

Israel Advanced Technology Industries (Hebrew: האיגוד הישראלי לתעשיות מתקדמות) or IATI is the umbrella organisation of the hi-tech and life sciences industries in Israel, which includes venture capital funds, R&D centres of multinational corporations, local small and large companies, technological and business incubators, acceleration programs for startup companies (accelerators), commercialisation companies of universities, hospitals, academia, service providers, municipalities, local councils and others.

The Association is a non-profit organisation, whose declared goals are to "serve as an umbrella organisation for the high-tech and life sciences industry in Israel, including individuals and companies engaged in research, development and marketing in high-tech fields, to investigate, initiate, develop and support policies and actions that will advance the high-tech and life sciences industry in Israel". Amongst the occupations of the organisation: Promote technology education (STEM), help solve the shortage of skilled human resource and encourage global tech companies (MNCs) to open research and development centres in Israel. The association has set a goal of integrating segmental populations (such as women, Ultra Orthodox Jews and Arabs) into Israeli high-tech and increasing diversity.

The association operates committees of industry leaders to promote various industrial and social issues. The main committees are: the Venture Capital Funds Committee, the Lawyers and Accountancy Committee, the Life Sciences Committee, the Government Relations Committee, the HR Committee, the IP Committee, the Conferences Committee and the Intellectual Property Committee.

== Establishment of the organisation ==
The Israeli Association for Advanced Industries was established as a merger of the High Technology Industry Association (HTIA) and the Israeli Life Science Association (ILSI), at the initiative of the then chairmen of the two unions. The official launch took place on 17/01/2012 and on 04/06/2012 of that year the association was registered with the Registrar of Associations. At the launch, Adv. Karin Mayer Rubinstein was appointed to the position of CEO of the union, and it was reported that the former chairmen will continue to serve as chairpersons until the chairmen are elected for a period of three years.

On 26/07/2012, internal elections were held for the first time. After the previous chairpersons resigned and did not stand for election, Yoav Chelouche was elected as chairman of the high-tech sector, and Dr. Benny Zeevi was elected chairman of the field of life sciences. Since then, elections have been held every three years, in which two chairpersons are chosen for joint ventures in the field of high-tech and the field of life sciences. In addition, the members of the board of directors are chosen according to a key representation of sub-sectors in the industry, and they meet quarterly. In the board of directors that elected on 26/09/2015 included, for the first time, a male and a female representatives from the ultra-Orthodox sector.

== Areas of activity ==
As part of its business development and marketing, and support activities for young companies, the Association holds annual conferences and professional seminars designed to establish contacts and cooperation, as well as host delegations of global entities. The Forum of Directors of the research and development of International Companies operating in Israel, which operates under the auspices of the Association, serves as a focal point for cooperation between global technology corporations and the relevant bodies in Israel.

The Association represents the high-tech industries of the political and professional echelons of government ministries and Knesset (The Legislative Authority in Israel) committees, such as the Ministries of Finance, Treasury, Education and more as well as local authorities and academic institutions. In this framework, the association initiated synchronises and integrates the ecosystem, for example by initiating joint projects with the Israeli government, including the Israeli Cyber Championship, which took place in 2015, and a competition to identify start-ups in high schools, under the auspices of the Ministry of Education. Another long-term project concerns encouragement of local institutional investments in Israeli tech companies.

The Association is a partner in programs for rapid training of engineers and programmers in response to a shortage of high-tech workers, according to a business model of cooperation between government agencies and the Innovation Authority and the business sector, a model approved by the Council of Innovation in July 2017.

Apart from these, the association produces reports on the state of Israeli technology. Among other things, the Association published a report on the information technology industry in Israel in 2015; Israel Life Sciences Report for 2018; A report on the contribution of venture capital funds to Israeli high-tech, as well as a report on tax policy changes for global technology corporations, in accordance with the OECD's BEPS (Base Erosion and Profit Shift Project) Tax for foreign investors on their investments in Israeli venture capital funds, and a report describing the shortage of skilled manpower in Israel's technology industries.

== See also ==
- Science and technology in Israel
