= QualitySolicitors =

Law firms in the United Kingdom

- Industry: Legal services
- Founded: 2009 (Leicester)
- Headquarters: St Ives, United Kingdom
- Number of locations: 200+
- Area served: United Kingdom
- Key people: Ian Wheeler (chief executive) Craig Holt (founder and president) Saleem Arif (founder and chief operating officer)
- Revenue: Circa £300 million (system)
- Website: www.qualitysolicitors.com

QualitySolicitors is a grouping of law firms in the United Kingdom. It was founded in 2009 and has over 200 branches. It is the first national chain of solicitors in the UK, following a franchise-type model based on independent ownership of small to medium High Street law firms trading under one brand name but sharing national marketing campaigns.

== History ==
QualitySolicitors was founded in 2009 as an internet-based alliance of independent law firms in the United Kingdom. In May 2010 member firms began to rebrand under the "QualitySolicitors" name, with 50 converting in November of that year.

In April 2011 QualitySolicitors agreed a deal with the retailer WHSmith under which QualitySolicitors would place representatives in up to 500 of its branches.

In October 2011 the private equity firm Palamon Capital Partners acquired a majority stake in the QualitySolicitors holding company in a deal estimated at £100 million. In March 2012 QualitySolicitors launched a £15 million television advertising campaign, the largest ever by a UK-based legal services provider.

In September 2012 it was announced that QualitySolicitors had formed a partnership with the California-based online legal services provider LegalZoom, as part of which the companies will jointly offer online legal services in the United Kingdom including company formations and divorce documents.

== Operations ==
QualitySolicitors has over 80 branches across the UK and previously held locations in 160 WHSmith outlets.

Member firms pay varying annual fees to the QualitySolicitors holding company. This revenue is used to fund central costs such as advertising.
