= Cappelletti (distillery) =

Italian company

Antica Erboristeria dott. Cappelletti is a producer of liqueurs and wines based in Aldeno, Italy.

== Attributes ==
It is based in Aldeno, a city in Trentino-Alto Adige in Northern Italy. Products are imported to the United States by Haus Alpenz.

As of 2018, the company had eight employees: three in production, three in administration, and two as commercial representatives. The business manufactures approximately 250,000 bottles per year.

== History ==
Antica Erboristeria Cappelletti was established in 1909 as a shop in Trento, on the Via Oss Mazzurana. The owner, Giuseppe Cappelletti, was an herbalist and apothecarist. After World War I, he moved the shop to the Piazza di Fiera. Cappelletti had no children, and so he passed the business to his brother's son Ferrante. Ferrante's son Gianpaolo later took over, and died in 2001. His children Luigi and Maddalena Cappelletti own the business today.

== Products ==
Notable products include:

- Amaro Sfumato Rabarbaro, an herbaceous and smoky liqueur made with Chinese rhubarb that grows wild in the Trentino region
- Brulé Bacchus
- Cappelletti, known to locals as Il Specialino, an aperitivo bitter made with Pinot Bianco, Garganega, and Trebbiano grapes, mountain herbs, and carmine for color
- Elisir Novasalus, an amaro made with 30 herbs, including aloe, gentian, and dandelion. The company's top seller.
- Pasubio, an amaro made with mountain wine, mountain pine, and wild berries.
