= S. Horowitz & Co. =

Israeli law firm

- Company type: Partnership (Israel)
- Industry: Law
- Founded: Jerusalem (1921)
- Headquarters: Tel Aviv, Israel
- Key people: Senior Partners — Yehoshua Horesh, Alex Hertman, Tal Band.
- Products: Legal advice
- Revenue: Unknown
- Number of employees: 240
- Website: www.s-horowitz.com

S. Horowitz & Co. is one of Israel's largest law firms, with over 180 lawyers, many of whom are multilingual and have practiced as lawyers in the US, England and South Africa. Its headquarters are in Tel Aviv. The firm claims specialization in high end corporate and commercial legal practices. It was ranked as Israel's overall leading law firm by the Practical Law Company "Which Lawyer? 2005" guidebook.

S. Horowitz & Co. is an Israeli member of Lex Mundi, one of the world's largest network of independent law firms based in 165 countries, states and provinces.

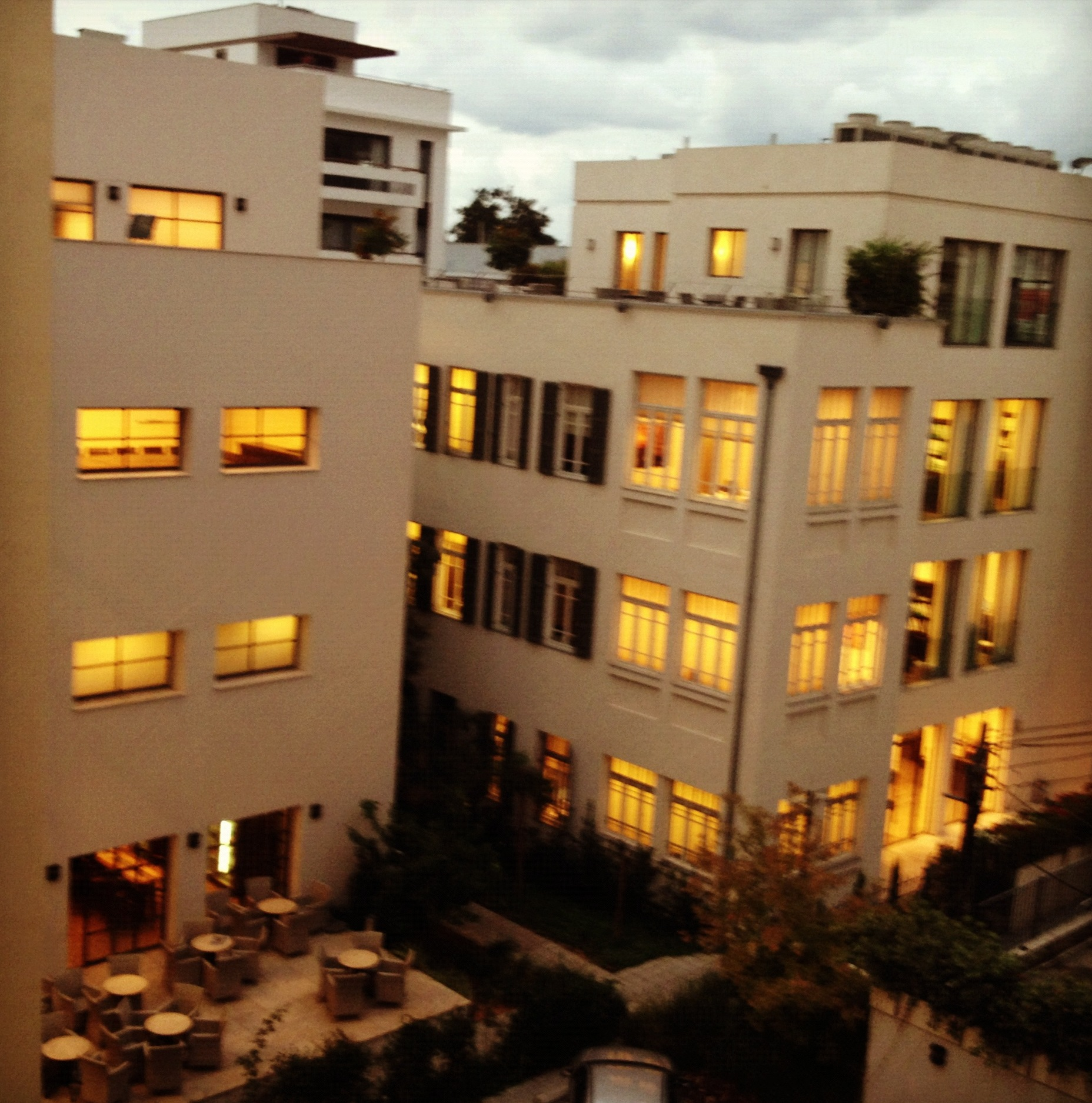
S. Horowitz offices in Tel Aviv

== History ==
=== British Mandate ===
Founded in 1921, S. Horowitz & Co. is the oldest and longest-established law firm in Israel.

Cambridge-educated barrister Shalom Horowitz (1880–1956) arrived in Jerusalem in 1922 and immediately joined the law firm of British barrister Harry Saker, which had been established a year earlier. When Saker returned to England in 1929, he left the firm to his colleague. In 1933, Abraham Levin joined as a partner, and the firm became S. Horowitz & Co.

Many of S. Horowitz & Co.'s first clients were British companies engaged in business activities in the British Mandate. However, the firm, whose office was located next to the old courthouse in the Russian Compound, quickly became involved in the process of nation-building. Shalom Horowitz advised on the establishment of Israel's most prominent institutions, including the Hebrew University of Jerusalem, the Hadassah Medical Center, the Weizmann Institute of Science, the Israel Electric Corporation, the Israel Lands Authority and the Jewish Agency. He was soon engaged in the country's first natural resources, energy and infrastructure projects, including the Dead Sea Quarries and the Naharaim Power Station in the northern part of Israel. In what would be the first of many of the firm's negotiations with the Israel Lands Authority, Horowitz obtained the authorization to lease the former swamp lands of the Hula Valley for agricultural use.

In the 1940s, the firm opened its first Tel Aviv office. Around this time, Shalom Horowitz retired, and the management of the office was taken over by Abraham Levin.

=== State of Israel ===
In 1965, Amnon Goldenberg joined the firm. Like Shalom Horowitz, he had been educated in England.

In 1986, the firm moved to its own building, S. Horowitz House, where it remains to this day.

== Notable clients ==
- Representing Teva Pharmaceutical Industries Ltd., in all its contentious matters in Israel, including patent infringement actions, patent oppositions, service inventions and trade secrets disputes, as well as providing freedom to operate opinions. This includes numerous patent litigation cases in Israel, regarding a wide array of generic versions of various drugs (in particular, blockbuster drugs, each having annual sales in excess of $1 billion), as well as cases relating to Teva's innovative products.

== Notable attorneys ==
In addition to numerous professors and partners, both at S. Horowitz and other firms, some of the more notable former S. Horowitz attorneys include:

- Chief Justice Asher Grunis.
- Supreme Court Justice Alfred Witkon.
- Supreme Court Justice Tsevi E. Tal.
- Supreme Court Justice Anat Baron.
- Prof. David Gilo, former head of the Israeli Competition Authority, and a faculty member at Tel Aviv University.
- Prof. Aeyal Gross, a faculty member at Tel Aviv University.
- Prof. Eli Bukspan, a senior faculty member at the Reichman University.
- Dr. Ilana Dayan, one of Israel's leading journalists.
- Dr. Yoram Turbowich, former head of the Israeli Competition Authority, former chief of staff for Israeli prime minister Ehud Olmert, and former chief executive officer of Discount Investment Corporation.
- Dr. Israel (Reli) Leshem, senior partner at Meitar law offices.
