= Law practice optimization =

Law Practice Optimization, or Legal Practice Optimization, or simply LPO as it is also known, represents the practice carried out by Law Practice Optimizers of improving the efficiency and client/attorney relationships within a law firm and improves the client intake of the firm.

LPO typically consists of three distinct stages, which are performed throughout an LPO campaign.

1. Basic business analysis.
2. The implementation of and training of LPO compliant software
3. LPO marketing.

Before LPO emerged, these three functions were typically handled by separate, specialized service providers, resulting in both a lengthy and expensive process. A law firm would start by hiring a business analyst, who may or may not have been familiar with the legal industry. Secondly, a law firm would need to investigate numerous software packages that are specialized for the legal industry. A package would have been chosen after much research, which may or may not have been conducted thoroughly. Ideally, the chosen software package would meet the needs of the firm, instead of only the person(s) who researched the software. Thirdly, the firm would then employ a law firm marketing company, and perhaps a website design company, to create the firm's internet presence; and, initiate an SEO (Search Engine Optimization) campaign to increase the firm's appearance in search results presented to the queries of those seeking legal services.

An LPO consulting company specializes in all three stages. Specialization increases the chances of a successful project. Specialization within one third-party service provider also lowers costs as compared to hiring three service providers. A greater chance of success combined with lower costs improves the likelihood of increased revenue through additional clients, improved efficiency, higher customer retention; and, an overall better return on investment.

Many law firms seek to decrease their reliance on paper documents or to establish a paperless office, out of consciousness for the environment, to increase efficiency and decrease operating expenses.

== Business analysis ==
In order for a Law Firm to be optimized, an analyst would be hired to review that firm's overall presence. This would include everything from the physical appearance and layout of the office, to the everyday work-flow being performed by the staff.

Initially the analyst would study the first impression a client received when entering the office. The analyst might ask questions such as, is the ambiance of the reception welcoming and comforting? Is the furniture appropriate? Is the reception desk organized? Are the telephone calls being handled properly? Is the client being serviced with professionalism and confidentiality?

After this initial review the analyst would spend time reviewing the firm's work, and then make suggestions to minimize unnecessary work and remove what is known as the double or triple entry system. An example of a double entry system is commonly found when one person is performing work on a file and then logging or billing his/her time on to a billing sheet. This billing sheet is then presented to another co-worker who then bills for work performed by another. In this example two workers were required where only one would have sufficed. A hired analyst would find each double entry, and make recommendations to find solutions to achieve a more efficient work-flow. In many instances these solutions will be resolved with the use of LPO software.

== Software implementation ==
Depending on the needs of the law firm, including factors such as the types of cases they handle and the size of the firm, an LPO company will typically recommend a legal practice management software package, and provide installation and training of the software. LPO software usually consists of case management, matter-specific modules, document management, time & billing functionality and provides the user the quickest methods of communicating case details with clients to ensure clients are kept informed of the status of their case whilst any of its details are immediately available to paralegals and attorneys working on it.

== Marketing ==
LPO marketing may comprise both the development and the marketing of Internet presence for the law firm. If the law firm has yet to possess its own website, then the LPO company will take care of the purchasing of a domain name, the creation of a suitable website and finally the internet marketing of the website through various channels, including social media channels such as Facebook and Twitter. Vertical channels are also investigated, including online lawyer directories. The law firm can expect to receive documented strategies and training from the LPO company so that the law firm's web site can maximize its online exposure and ultimately be found by potential clients looking for its services.

Implementing a law firm digital marketing strategy can take several months, and it is difficult to define when traffic will improve as a result of the strategy. It may take many months after implementation for SEO to generate significant improvements in traffic."Depending on how competitive your niche is, generally speaking, a year should be enough to have you in position or have you very close to being on page one for your money term", stated Laurence P. Banville, Esq.

== See also ==
- Law firm
- Business analysis
- Search engine optimization
- Internet marketing
- Legal matter management
