= Access to justice =

Legal principle

Access to justice is a basic principle in rule of law which describes how citizens should have equal access to the justice system and/or other justice services so that they can effectively resolve their justice problems. Without access to justice, people are not able to fully exercise their rights, challenge discrimination, or hold decision-makers accountable for their actions.

"Providing access to justice for all" was adopted as a universal ambition, when it became part of SDG16, one of the Sustainable Development Goals in 2015. In the context of SDG16 a conceptual model for the global Justice Gap was developed and it was estimated that "5.1 billion people - or two thirds of the world population - do not have meaningful access to justice globally". Recognizing the size of the justice gap, an approach to justice sector governance and reform was developed call people-centered justice.

The manner in which countries ensure that all people have access to justice varies. Access to justice may be increased through properly funded and staffed legal aid organizations that provide free legal services to the poor, and through pro bono programs through which volunteer attorneys provide services and representation, or through other programs designed to help people gain. Access to justice is a broad concept that includes legal remedies in courts but also in other institutions of justice.

Empirical research into access to justice has increased in the past decade, by academics in the field of sociology of law, by researchers working for national or global policy-makers and through legal needs surveys and other efforts to collect people-centered justice data.

== International initiatives ==
=== Free Access to Law Movement ===
The Free Access to Law Movement (FALM) was founded in 1992, with the goal of providing free online access to basic legal information and resources. In 2002, FALM adopted the Declaration on Free Access to Law. The goal of the movement has been to ensure that legal information is freely available to everyone. The declaration declared public legal information to be the common heritage of mankind.

The member organizations of FALM, primarily through the Internet, engaged in widespread publication of primary and secondary legal information. Early examples include the Legal Information Institute at Cornell Law School and the Australasian Legal Information Institute, a joint project of the University of Technology Sydney and the University of New South Wales. The latter involved early adoption of hypertext technology to represent laws as a network of nodes, each representing a section.

In 2013, Cornell Law School established the Journal of Open Access to Law, to promote international research on the topic of open access to law.

== Initiatives by country ==
=== Japan ===
Japan Legal Support Center, which is abbreviated as JLSC, provides a legal access to justice in any place in Japan. JLSC was founded on April 10, 2006 and started its operation on October 2, 2006.

JLSC has 50 local offices and 11 branch offices of the local offices.

=== Myanmar ===
MyJustice is a European Union-funded Access to Justice Initiative aiming to equip the people of Myanmar with the knowledge, confidence and opportunities to resolve conflicts fairly, equitably and justly. Since 2015 they have setting up a number of "justice centres" across Myanmar to improve access to justice by offering free legal advice to low-income and marginalised people, as well as being involved in projects relating to the introduction of legal aid and legal training.

=== Pakistan ===
Access to Justice Initiatives (AJI) are a cluster of projects carried out by the Sarhad Rural Support Programme (SRSP) in Khyber Pakhtunkhwa, Pakistan, which aim at enhancing legal awareness and empowering citizens at the grass-roots level by enabling them to lobby for their rights and seek remedies for their legal problems.

==== Configuration ====
Access to Justice Initiatives comprises the following projects:

1. Legal Empowerment
2. Aitebaar Alternate Dispute Resolution
3. Aitebaar Awareness Rising
4. Strengthening Rule of Law in Malakand
5. Community Based Conflict Resolution

==== Features ====
A common feature of the projects is that they all aim at strengthening the capacity of the disadvantaged communities to protect their rights and to participate and hold public institutions accountable. In traditional hierarchical societies, civil society organisations face challenges in promoting access to services for marginalized and vulnerable groups.

The projects seek to addresses issues of weak links among justice mechanisms and a lack of reliable legal support. Some of the projects focus on the informal justice institutions so that alternative dispute resolution methods can be used to settle disputes at community level, while helping to create a forum for dialogue between the formal and informal mechanisms. Members of the communities are trained as paralegals to bridge the gap between the most vulnerable members of society and the state institutions. In remote and backward areas of Pakistan the public at large is reluctant in trusting the police or lawyers but shows greater inclination in trusting notables of their own communities, who often resolve disputes via the Jirga system. The paralegals and mediators are briefed about human rights, legal system and the limits of their authority in solving complicated disputes. This ensures that rights of the participants are not forfeited. The Dispute Resolution Councils (DRC's) set up in this respect are required to work in collaboration the local police to ensure transparency and efficiency. A significant number of women have been trained as mediators and paralegal to make the programme more receptive to women.

Legal aid is provided to individuals whose troubles cannot be resolved through negotiation, conciliation, mediation or other informal method's. Very often, case which merit legal aid involve issues of child marriage, forced marriage, matrimonial cruelty, child custody, deprivation of inheritance, discrimination etc.

=== United States ===
The current largest initiative to solve the Access to Justice issue in the United States is the Legal Services Corporation (LSC). The LSC is a non-profit funded by Congress. Currently, the LSC spans around 800 offices around the country and funds 130 independent non-profits. Typically, legal aid organizations can use LSC funds only to serve the legal needs of people with household incomes at or below 125% of the federal poverty level. Based on LSC's latest justice gap report in 2022, around 50 million people have household incomes below 125% of the poverty threshold.

Because the traditional model for delivery services demanded all legal work to be done in a bespoke manner the supply of legal services is generally inelastic. Households that are ineligible for legal aid but are not able to easily afford bespoke legal services are effectively underserved by the traditional model. A report by the American Bar Association Standing Committee on the Delivery of Legal Services found that "among moderate-income households, 39% used the legal system to attempt resolution of their legal problems, 23% attempted resolution without legal help, and 26% took no action." Relatedly, the LSC has also found that low-income Americans in 2022 did not receive any legal help or enough legal help for 92% of the problems that substantially impacted them in the past year.

==== Limited Legal Assistance ====
Due to the lack of funding, most legal nonprofits have to turn more clients away than they take in for direct legal representation. So, a cost effective way of providing legal assistance is through limited legal assistance. This can range from help from a trained non-lawyer with court documents such as a paralegal, a self help center in a courthouse, or a phone call with an attorney giving you advice over your situation. It enables non-profits to help more people, while also remedying the issue of limited funds.

==== Technological solutions ====
Lawyers, designers, and computers scientists have considered ways to use technology to improve access to justice for people who cannot afford a lawyer. Often called justice technology, this "refers to a technology or data project that is used in the administration of a justice system or service, creates access to that system or service, or increases the agency of justice system-involved people through support, like information or assistance." While there is increased attention and funding going into the justice technology sector, it has yet to see large scale successes.

There are numerous university-based programs working at the intersection of access to justice and technology:

The Georgetown University Law Center started a Judicial Innovation Fellowship program in the fall of 2022. The novel program will place private industry technologists in state and tribal courts to develop new software that improves the public's access to justice and court administration.

The Berkman Center at Harvard Law School has been working with Massachusetts housing court judge Dina Fein to design access to civil justice in the state for pro se litigants, low-income people, litigants who aren't proficient in English, and people with disabilities. CodeX, the Stanford Center for Legal Informatics, hosts projects such as Legal.io and Ravel Law, addressing the application of legal informatics to access to justice issues, and convenes a community bringing researchers, lawyers, entrepreneurs and technologists together to work side-by-side to advance the frontier of legal technology.

Illinois Institute of Technology (IIT's) Institute of Design and the Chicago-Kent College of Law collaborated on a multi-year redesign of self-represented litigants' court experience. Their 2002 report documented their investigation of current assistance systems, creation of a new design protocol, and plan for a new system design. The report also puts forward a number of concept designs, reimagining how the court system may work and people may access it. Some of their proposals include:

- "CourtNet", a network inside the court building, to link together judicial staff and the public;
- "Interactive Translator", a software tool that can be used in interviewing and court exchanges, able to translate verbal and text communications into different languages;
- "Archetypes", a diagnosis platform that models users' legal problems, classifies them, and offers referral services;
- "Pursuit Evaluator", an online tool to allow potential litigants evaluate whether pursuing a case would be worth their time, money, and effort
- "Complaint Formulator", an electronic interface to let litigants extract data from their problem situation and assemble it into various legal documents;
- "Informer", software that uses sample cases to help litigants model their own forms and teaches them how to file correctly; and
- "Case Tracker", an interactive searchable archive of a litigant's case history, that provides a clear timeline and reference to past actions.

== Analysis ==
=== United States ===
Researchers have found that most civil justice problems American experience, worthy of legal process, receive no legal attention whatsoever. Legal professionals give them no consideration and they never reach court. Those who receive representation through hiring lawyers represent a fraction of people who have a legitimate cause. This crisis has been labelled as an "unmet legal need." Every year, 55 million Americans experience 260 million legal problems. Among these legal problems, the 120 million legal problems are mostly not resolved every year. Low-income Americans are most vulnerable among the population, but the access to justice issue is experienced nationally among all different groups of the population. The access to justice problem has been said to have impacted all types of people, perpetuating serious legal, social, economic, and political consequences across American society. Increased access to justice is viewed as the primary advocated solution.

Part of the American crisis in access to justice is the presumption that any legal problem necessitates the involvement of a lawyer. The expansion of greater legal services, accessible to more people, has resulted from this presumption. According to Rebecca L. Sandefur, problems with access to justice can be resolved through a departure from this framing:

Resolving justice problems lawfully does not always require lawyers’ assistance. Evidence shows that only some of the justice problems experienced by the public benefit from lawyers’ services or other legal interventions, while others do not. That is because such intervention is excessive or because it might be the wrong treatment for the problem. This finding holds true whether the outcome of interest is benefits to society or benefits to a person with a problem.

Most civil justice problems are handled by people on their own, or with advice from family and friends. The most common reason people give for not turning to lawyers is not the cost of lawyers’ help. There is a much more important reason: people do not consider law as a solution for their justice problems; they do not think of their problems as being “legal,” even when the legal system could help solve them. They think of them simply as problems: problems in relationships, problems at work, or problems with neighbors. One of the most important reasons that people handle their problems on their own rather than seeking any kind of formal help is that they believe that they already understand their situation and their options for handling it.
