= Practical Law Company =

Practical Law
- Industry: Legal Publishing
- Founder: Chris Millerchip; Rob Dow
- Owner: Thomson Reuters
- Number of employees: 800
- Parent: West Publishing Corporation
- Website: www.practicallaw.com

Practical Law, a division of West Publishing Corporation, is a legal publishing company which provides legal know-how for business lawyers. It also acts as secretariat for the GC100 group of general counsel and company secretaries.

According to the AmLaw Daily, "The company was set up in the early 1990s by Chris Millerchip and Rob Dow to publish PLC Magazine. Since then it has expanded to provide predominantly web-based subscription services to law firms and law departments across a range of specialist subject areas such as corporate, finance, property, tax and intellectual property. Practical Law, the brainchild of two former Slaughter and May lawyers, launched in 1990 as a print venture geared toward transactional lawyers in the United Kingdom. The company's first publications detailed the lawyering requirements for specific types of transactions--highly structured leveraged buyouts and the like--and discussed why certain structures are used for certain types of deals. "We created the thing that we wanted when we were practicing," says Chris Millerchip, Practical Law's cofounder and chairman. Ten years later, the company developed a set of Web-based tools meant to help transactional lawyers work more efficiently. Practical Law created—and continues to update—practice notes, document templates, standard clauses, deal checklists, and tools that lay out the basics of dealmaking for junior associates."

Practical Law was acquired in 2013 by Thomson Reuters in a deal speculated by senior industry sources to be worth £300m. At the time it had 750 employees and a turnover of £48.2m

Practical Law has a staff of approximately 500 in the UK, based in London, and 300 in the US, based in New York.
