= Legal text =

Legal text can refer to several types of text written for various purposes related to the law, including:

- Law book, any book about law
- Legal treatise, a publication containing all the law relating to a particular area
- In general, texts studied in the course of legal research
- Disclaimer, a statement intended to specify or delimit the scope of rights and obligations that may be exercised and enforced by parties in a legally recognized relationship
- Fine print, also known as small print, or "mouseprint" – smaller, less noticeable print that accompanies the main text of an advertisement or promotion
- Legal English, sometimes referred to as "legalese" – the type of English as used in legal writing
- Terms and conditions – provisions giving the precise details of a contractual relationship
