= Legal research =

Process of collecting information necessary to support legal decision-making

Legal research is "the process of identifying and retrieving information necessary to support legal decision-making. In its broadest sense, legal research includes each step of a course of action that begins with an analysis of the facts of a problem and concludes with the application and communication of the results of the investigation."

The processes of legal research vary according to the country and the legal system involved. Legal research involves tasks such as:

1. Finding primary sources of law, or primary authority, in a given jurisdiction. The main primary sources of law include constitutions, case law, statutes, and regulations.
2. Searching secondary authority for background information about legal topics. Secondary authorities can come in many forms, such as law reviews, legal dictionaries, legal treatises, and legal encyclopedias such as American Jurisprudence and Corpus Juris Secundum.
3. Searching non-legal sources for investigative or supporting factual information.

Legal research is performed by anyone with a need for legal information, including lawyers, law librarians, and paralegals. Sources of legal information can include printed books, free legal research websites (like Cornell Law School's Legal Information Institute, Findlaw.com, Martindale Hubbell, or CanLII), and websites or software providing paid access to legal research databases such as Wolters Kluwer, LexisNexis, Westlaw, Lex Intell, VLex, and Bloomberg Law. Law libraries around the world provide research services to help their patrons in law schools, law firms, and other research environments find the legal information they need. Many law libraries and institutions provide free access to legal information on the web, either individually or via collective action, such as with the Free Access to Law Movement.

== Databases and software tools ==
=== Free-to-use ===
Although many jurisdictions publish laws online, case law is often accessed through specialty online databases. Free-to-access services, through the free law movement, include: Australasian Legal Information Institute, British and Irish Legal Information Institute, CanLII, Law Library Resource Xchange, Legal Information Institute, Lex Intell, and LexML Brasil.

A variety of commercial services offer free tools to conduct legal research as well. Google offers a free, searchable database of federal and state case law as part of Google Scholar.

=== Commercial ===
Commercial services for legal research include both primary and secondary sources. Commercial services can be country-specific, international, or comparative. As of 2010, commercial legal research tools in the United States generated an estimated $8 billion in revenues per year.

Some governments also provide access to certain resources through paid databases, such as the United States PACER law system.

== Third-party legal research providers ==
Legal research may be done by lawyers and individuals who are not lawyers. Due to the complexity of laws and the regulated nature of the practice of law, legal research is often completed by lawyers. Legal research is known to take significant time and effort, and access to online legal research databases can be costly. Individuals and corporations therefore often outsource legal research to law firms that have specialized legal knowledge and research tools. Even still, with due consideration given to ethical concerns, law firms and other practitioners may turn to third-party legal research providers to outsource their own legal research needs.

Recent developments in legal research include the use of machine learning and AI-assisted tools to retrieve case law, analyze risk, and accelerate contract analysis processes.

== See also ==
- Law dictionary
- Legal periodical
- Legal research in the United States
- Legal treatise
- List of sources of law in the United States
- Oxford Law Citator
