= Hong Kong Legal Information Institute =

Non-governmental organisation in Hong Kong

- Chinese: 香港法律資訊中心
- Founders: University of Hong Kong's Department of Computer Science and Faculty of Law; Australasian Legal Information Institute
- Type: NGO
- Region served: Hong Kong
- Services: Provides access to primary legal materials
- Website: Official website

Hong Kong Legal Information Institute
- Traditional Chinese: 香港法律資訊中心
Transcriptions
Yue: Cantonese
- Jyutping: hoeng1 gong2 faat3 leot6 zi1 seon3 zung1 sam1

The Hong Kong Legal Information Institute (Chinese: 香港法律資訊中心, HKLII; pronounced "H K Lee") is a non-governmental organisation in Hong Kong. Its mission is to provide free access to primary legal materials (and some publicly available secondary material) from Hong Kong.

== Operation ==
HKLII was developed and is jointly operated by the University of Hong Kong's Department of Computer Science and Faculty of Law, with the assistance of the Australasian Legal Information Institute.
