= American Law Reports =

- Discipline: Law
- Language: English

Publication details
- History: 1919–present
- Publisher: West

Standard abbreviations
- Bluebook: A.L.R.
- ISO 4: Am. Law Rep.

In American law, the American Law Reports are a resource used by American lawyers to find a variety of sources relating to specific legal rules, doctrines, or principles. It has been published since 1919, originally by Lawyers Cooperative Publishing, and currently by West (a business unit of Thomson Reuters) and remains an important tool for legal research.

Each ALR volume contains several annotations. An annotation is an article that summarizes the evolution of a very specific legal concept in a concise and precise fashion. The article will either be preceded by the full text of an important relevant case, or in later series, contain a reference to the text of the case, which is reproduced at the end of the volume.

The article will contain a wide variety of relevant citations to cases from throughout the United States and secondary sources like law review articles. The range and number of citations is always strongly representative but not always guaranteed to be completely comprehensive.

Although similar in tone to the articles in legal encyclopedias, ALR annotations are different in that they are not organized alphabetically, and they tend to delve more deeply into a specific legal principle or doctrine, while, in contrast, encyclopedia articles aim for a broader view of the legal issue. In addition, ALR articles are careful to provide cases on both sides of the legal issue and provide listings of cases according to their jurisdiction.

Since the annotations are published in the order the leading cases were decided, there are various finding aids. The combined ALR Index indexes topics covered from ALR2d to the current series of ALR and all series of ALR Fed. West's ALR Digest now follows the classification system of the West American Digest System, and includes headnotes for the reported cases, as well as references to the annotations. For topics covered entirely by federal law, the softbound Quick Index indexes annotations in ALR Fed. The softbound Table of Cases (for a state case) or ALR Federal Table of Cases (for a federal case) provides ALR references for a particular case. A reader may also use the references in American Jurisprudence, Corpus Juris Secundum, and state encyclopedias published by Thomson West to find a more in-depth discussion in ALR. Finally, ALR articles may also be searched on Westlaw.

ALR has been published in several series (the current series is ALR7th) and there are series of ALR Fed (which focuses on federal law). ALR3d through ALR6th and ALR Fed are updated by pocket part supplements (the first series has a citation service, and ALR2d a Later Case Service). Annotations may be superseded by a later annotation in which the editor reanalyzes the law in light of recent developments.
