= List of sources of law in the United States =

== Federal ==
- Constitution of the United States

=== Statutes ===
- List of United States federal legislation
- Acts listed by popular name, via Cornell University
- United States Statutes at Large
  - Volumes 1 through 18, 1789–1875, via Library of Congress
- Public Laws (PL)
  - Current Congress only, via the U.S. Government Printing Office
  - 104th Congress through current Congress, via the U.S. Government Printing Office
- United States Code (USC)
  - U.S. Code, via Cornell University
  - U.S. Code, via the U.S. Government Printing Office
  - U.S. Code, via FindLaw.com
  - U.S. Code via house.gov
  - U.S. Code, via USCodeSurf.com

=== Administrative regulations ===
- Code of Federal Regulations (CFR)
- List of United States federal executive orders (EO)

=== Court precedents ===
- Findlaw Cases and Codes
- United States Reports – Supreme Court cases
  - Lists of United States Supreme Court cases
- Federal Reporter – Courts of Appeals and Federal Claims cases
  - List of notable United States Courts of Appeals cases
- Federal Supplement – District Courts cases
- Federal Appendix – "Unpublished" cases

== States ==
- State constitutions

=== Court precedents ===
- List of notable United States state supreme court cases
- Findlaw Cases and Codes

=== Statutes ===
- Findlaw State Government page

=== Regulations ===
- List of State Administrative Codes and Registers from the National Association of Secretaries of State

=== Local codes and ordinances ===
- American Legal Publishing's Code Library
- E-Codes from the General Code Corporation
- Municipal Code Corporation's Online Library

== Secondary sources ==
- List of Uniform Acts (United States)
- American Jurisprudence
- Corpus Juris Secundum
- Restatements of the Law
- Casebooks
- Law reviews

== See also ==
- United States law
- List of legal abbreviations
- Legal research
- Legal research in the United States
- For more information on official, unofficial, and authenticated online state laws and regulations, see Matthews & Baish, State-by-State Authentication of Online Legal Resources, American Association of Law Libraries, 2007.
