= Legal research in the United States =

Legal research is the process of identifying and retrieving information to support legal arguments and decisions. Finding relevant legal information can be challenging and may involve the use of electronic research tools as well as printed books and materials. However, many resources that are useful for legal research are fee-based, and many are not easily accessible.

== Primary sources ==
Primary sources of law are the original sources of the law. Such sources include statutes, government regulations, case law and the text of the state and federal constitutions.

=== Judicial branch sources (Cases) ===
The Judicial branch is the court system. Each jurisdiction in the U.S. judiciary (federal and the fifty states) has any number of courts, mainly one of three types:

1. a trial court,
2. an appeals court,
3. a "court of last resort," often (but not always) known as a Supreme Court.

At the federal level, there is a Supreme Court of the United States, United States court of appeals, and a trial court, which is known as the United States district court. The federal appellate courts are subdivided into numbered "circuits." Pennsylvania, for example, is in the jurisdiction of the Third Circuit Court of Appeals.

In general, the decisions of a higher court in a court system may be considered "binding" on the lower courts in that court system. The decisions of the Supreme court of a particular state are binding on the courts within that state. However, the decisions of a Pennsylvania state court may or may not be followed by a federal court in the Third Circuit, which includes Pennsylvania. The status of United States Supreme court opinions is complex, but U.S. Supreme Court decisions are final on both federal disputes and federal issues raised in state courts.

Only a small percentage of court decisions are officially published in a print court reporter. The most published decisions are issued by the United States Supreme court. State trial courts produce the lowest percentage of published cases. Some courts provide copies of their decisions free on the web while others do not. Even if they are on the web they seldom go back before 1994, when the web first became popular. The only exception is with U.S. Supreme Court opinions.

Cases on the web can often be found via the website of the individual court. The Supreme Court of the United States, for example, provides the text of recent opinions on its website. It is one of the best places to obtain new opinions. The United States court of appeals and State courts can also be a source of free legal information.

In print, to find the cases, legal researchers use indexes of various types. Classification systems provide index terms. For example, there may be a category of law, torts (non-crime injuries to people). There are many types of torts, or causes of Action, such as slander. These causes of actions have various elements which must be proved to establish a claim (there may also be various defenses). The general category, the cause of action and the various elements of the cause of action and defenses may all be index terms. The major classification for finding law cases is the West American Digest System.

The key to using legal indexes is to identify not only the key facts but the legal issues which are central to the case. Keyword searches in databases may also be a challenge, because people may describe legal concepts in varying ways. "Issue spotting" is a skill that lawyers home in law school and throughout their careers as they gain experience. For the layperson, reading secondary sources, such as books and journal articles, can help.

Once a case has been found, legal researchers must make sure that it has not been overturned by a higher court. Lawyers use citators such as Shepard's Citations to make sure that their case is still "good law." This process is often known as Shepardizing after the name of the service. Citators track resources, written at a later point in time, which cite back to a particular case. Because cases cite to related cases, citators can be used to find cases which are on the same topic. A common research strategy is to use "one good case" to find related cases.

Legal forms can be some of the hardest documents to find because one person may call a form by one name while another person knows it by an entirely different name (neither of which may be the actual, official name of the form). The same form may be known by a different name in a different jurisdiction. Law libraries often have many sets of formbooks to search.

Legal researchers may also need the briefs and other background materials connected with a case, which are included in docket records. Other types of documents may exist in databases which cannot be searched with search engines such as Google. These 'invisible web' sources may take time to ferret out.

=== Legislative branch sources (Statutes) ===
Some jurisdictions provide copies of their statutes online while others do not. You can often find new, or "slip laws" on the web (arranged in chronological order), as well as the subject arrangement of the statutes, known as the codified version, or code. The official code for federal statutes, the United States Code is usually one to two years out of date both in print and on the web. Legal Researchers often use the more timely, commercially published United States Code Annotated (USCA) or the United States Code Service (USCS). The USCA is available on Westlaw while the USCS is available on Lexis. They are called 'annotated codes' because they include summaries of cases which interpret the meaning of the statute. They may also include references to journal articles, legal encyclopedias and other research materials.

In addition to the text of the current law itself, legal researchers may also have to research the background documents connected with the statute, which is known as Legislative history. Legislative history is used to find what is known as the "legislative intent," or purpose behind statutory language. Again, legislative history documents may be found both in print in law libraries and government documents libraries, as well as in online formats such as Lexis and Westlaw.

THOMAS the Library of Congress legislative information service, provides the full text of proposed bills, bill status information (did it become a public law? who sponsored it? what committee was it referred to?), the text of debates from the Congressional Record, the full text of committee reports and other legislative information. The Library of Congress provides access to legislative documents from 1774 through 1875 as part of its American Memory Project Century of Lawmaking for a New Nation digital library.

=== Executive branch sources (Regulations) ===
A legislature usually has neither the time nor the expertise to administer all of the details of a particular statute. It may, for example, pass a statute mandating clean water. However, it delegates the authority to actually implement the statute to a Government agency, such as the United States Environmental Protection Agency. Agencies issue administrative Regulations to implement the details of the "enabling legislation" that gave the agency authority to act.

The challenge with the executive branch is to track down the rules and regulations of federal and state administrative agencies. Luckily administrative regulations have a "life cycle" that is very similar to that of statutes. Regulations start out as an agency document, which many agencies now post on the web. Similar to statutes, regulations are often published in chronological order in registers, and finally are published in subject order in codes.

Federal regulations, for example, are first printed in the Federal Register, before they are published in subject order in the Code of Federal Regulations.

Because of this "publication pattern" in order to find out if there has been a change with respect to a particular regulation a print CFR user has to go through a two-step process of checking 1) the List of Sections Affected (LSA) and 2) the latest issue of the Federal Register for the current month. The United States Government Printing Office has an e-CFR pilot project is underway to provide a version of the CFR without having to refer to a separate publication for updates.

The foremost executive branch entity is, of course, the Office of President of the United States. The White House has its own website. Presidential documents are published in the Federal Register and in Title 3 of the Code of Federal Regulations (CFR). Presidential documents can also be accessed in the Weekly Compilation of Presidential Documents and the Public Papers of the Presidents available in print and at the United States Government Printing Office website.

The relationship between statutes and regulations means that one can usually never consider just a regulation alone. This intertwined grouping of regulations, statutes, and cases is often best deciphered using secondary sources such as books and journal articles.

== Secondary sources ==
Legal reference books and journal articles are available at some public libraries and at law school libraries. In law libraries books known as "legal treatises" are available that summarize the law on specific subjects. Law school libraries also hold legal encyclopedias, such as Corpus Juris Secundum or American Jurisprudence and resources such as American Law Reports. Many major legal research materials may be found online, through both free services, such as Law Library Resource Xchange, PACER (law), and Google Scholar, and commercial services for Computer-assisted legal research. Law dictionaries can be found in many libraries, at free online dictionaries, and from online commercial services.

Many law reviews, other legal journals and magazines, and legal newspapers place content on the web. Not all law journals provide their text on the web, and some content may be placed behind a paywall.

== Legal citation ==
Legal citations direct readers to the source of information cited within a legal document. When conducting legal research, part of the challenge is to figure out how to cite to items, or how to decipher a legal citation encountered in a primary or secondary source. The vendor neutral citation movement has developed to try to make citations more broadly understandable without specific reference to a particular guide to legal citation. However, it is important to use citations that will be understood by the audience for the legal research project.

== See also ==
- Legal treatise
- Law dictionary
- Law
- Natural law
