= Secondary authority =

Source which attempts to explain the text of a primary legal authority

In law, a secondary authority is an authority purporting to explain the meaning or applicability of the actual verbatim texts of primary authorities (such as constitutions, statutes, case law, administrative regulations, executive orders, treaties, or similar legal instruments).

Some secondary authority materials are written and published by governments to explain the laws in simple, non-technical terms, while other secondary authority materials are written and published by private companies, non-profit organizations, or other groups or individuals. Some examples of primarily American secondary authority are:

- Law review articles, comments and notes (written by law professors, practicing lawyers, law students, etc.)
- Legal textbooks, such as legal treatises and hornbooks
- Legal digests, such as the West American Digest System
- Annotations published in statute books, codes, or other materials, such as the annotations in the American Law Reports series
- Legal encyclopedias (such as Corpus Juris Secundum, Encyclopedia of Law and American Jurisprudence)
- Legal dictionaries (such as Black's Law Dictionary). See Law Dictionary
- Restatements of the Law published by the American Law Institute
- Legal briefs and memoranda;
- Tax forms and instructions published by governments
- Government publications explaining or summarizing the laws
- Government employee manuals (such as the Internal Revenue Manual for employees of the Internal Revenue Service)
- Course materials from continuing legal education seminars
- Debate in legislatures, including such commentaries published in the Congressional Record (this may reveal legislative intent)
- Other similar materials

In the United States, various legal scholars disagree over whether legislative histories in the form of texts of congressional committee reports should be considered to be secondary authority or, alternatively, primary authority.

Although secondary authorities are sometimes used in legal research (especially, to allow a researcher to gain a preliminary, overall understanding of an unfamiliar area of law) and are sometimes even cited by courts in deciding cases, secondary authorities are generally afforded less weight than the actual texts of primary authority. However, some treatises are cited so frequently as to enjoy a select status among legal authorities.

Textbooks are generally not considered as secondary authorities apart from certain long-standing and well-reputed ones.
