= William Kip =

William Kip may refer to:

- William Ingraham Kip, American Episcopal bishop
- William Fargo Kip, American lawyer and legal librarian
