= Thomas Beven =

British lawyer and legal scholar

Thomas Beven (1855? – 16 January 1911) was a British lawyer and legal scholar. He wrote several legal treatises.

A 1885 biographical directory states that Thomas Beven was born in 1855, but as his obituary states he died aged 59, this is likely incorrect. He attended King's College London and The Queen's College, Oxford. He began his articles at the Inner Temple on 6 November 1871 and was called to the bar on 7 June 1875.

Beven's treatise on negligence went through four editions: 1889, 1895, 1908, and one posthumous edition in 1929. A 1911 work on employers' liability noted that Beven's treatise on negligence was "a standard authority at the English bar for many years".

Beven died on 16 January 1911 at his home in Hackney, London, aged 59. His will was proved in the Chancery Division in 1914. The presiding judge, noting that Beven had written a treatise on negligence, suggested that Beven may well have been negligent in writing his own will.

== Publications ==
- Principles of the Law of Negligence. London: Stevens and Haynes. 1859. (2d edition, 1895; 3d edition, 1908)
- The Law of Employers' Liability and Workmen's Compensation (4th ed.). London: Stevens and Haynes. 1909.
- The House of Lords on the Law of Trespass to Realty and Children as Trespassers. London: Stevens and Haynes. 1909.
