= Law library =

Special library for legal research

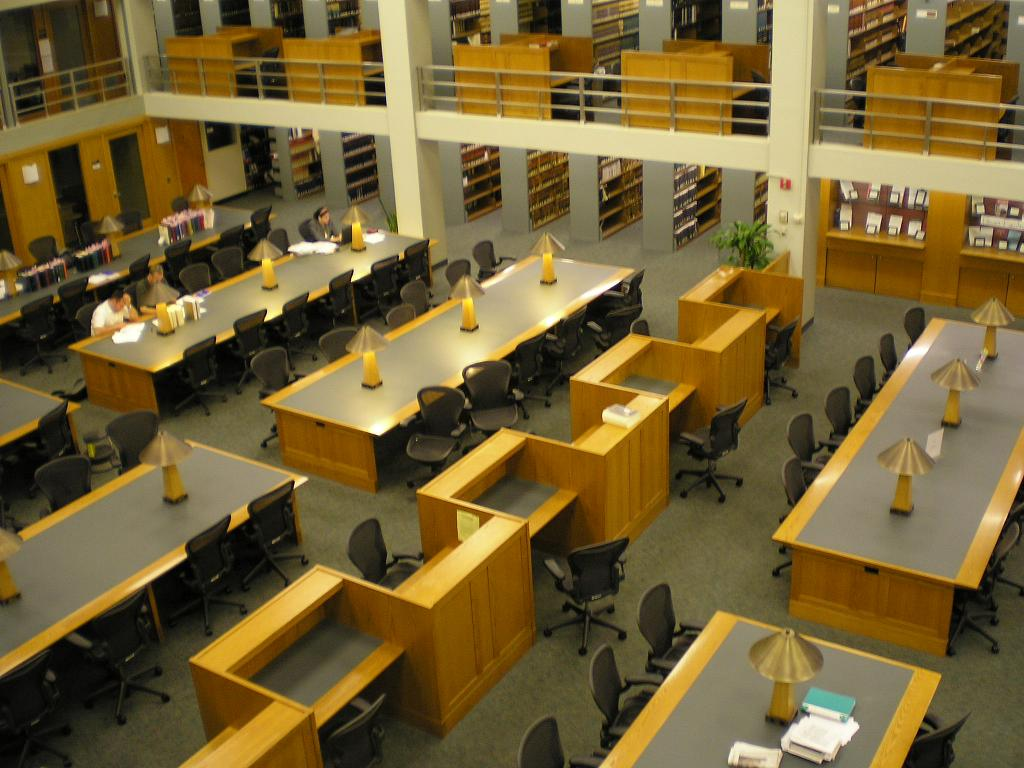
Leo T. Kissam Memorial Library, the law library of the Fordham University School of Law, also a federal depository library

A law library is a specialist library used by law students, lawyers, judges and their legal assistants, and academics in order to research the law or its history. Law libraries can also be used by others who work in local government or legislatures to assist with drafting or advocating for laws, as well as individuals who are party to a case, particularly self represented, or pro se in the United States, litigants, who do not have legal representation.

A law library may contain print, computer assisted legal research, and microform collections of laws in force, session laws, superseded laws, foreign and international law, and other research resources, e.g. continuing legal education resources and legal encyclopedias (e.g. Corpus Juris Secundum among others), legal treatises, and legal history. A law library may also have law librarians who help legal researchers navigate law library collections and who teach legal research. Some law libraries serve scholars from around the world, e.g. Institute of Advanced Legal Studies in London and the New York City Bar Association Law Library.

Law libraries in the United States are usually classified as a type of special library because of their focus on providing specialized resources, as well as their specialized and limited user base.

Most law schools around the world have a law library, or in some universities, at least a section of the university library devoted to law. In the United States, law school libraries may be subject to accreditation review by the American Bar Association Standards of Legal Education.

Law libraries may be found in courts (e.g. judge's chambers), legislatures (e.g. the Law Library of Congress), prison libraries, government departments, private law firms, and barristers' chambers.

== England and Commonwealth countries ==
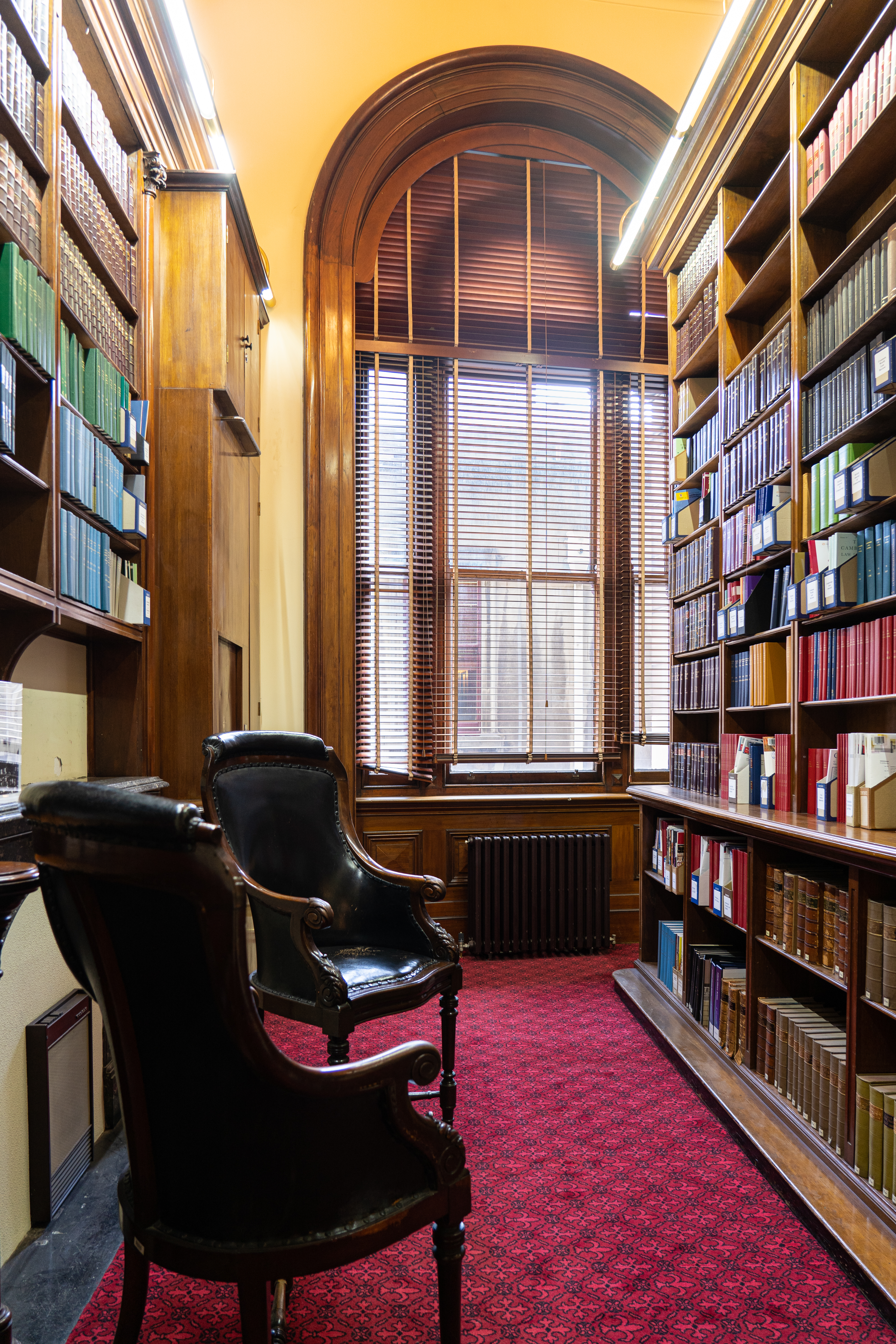
The interior of the Law Library of the Supreme Court of Victoria

Outside of the United States, the largest and most extensive law libraries are those found in countries that follow the English common law which spread throughout the world with the expansion of the British Empire. These countries include but are not limited to Australia, Canada, India, and New Zealand. Law libraries in these countries can be found in law schools, courts, government, private law firms, and barristers chambers.

The largest law library in the United Kingdom is the Bodleian Law Library with a collection of over 550,000 volumes. Outside of England, the largest law library in the Commonwealth of Nations is Osgoode Hall Law School's at York University in Canada, with more than 500,000 print volumes. The earliest common law law libraries were founded in the late 15th century in London and include Gray's Inn and Lincoln's Inn.

Special collections of legal literature in university and research libraries in England include the Viner collection at the Bodleian Library, University of Oxford (the personal library of Charles Viner, bequeathed to the Radcliffe Library in 1756); a collection of English legal manuscripts at Cambridge University Library; the Smuts collection on Commonwealth law, the Maitland collection on legal history, and the Clark, Roby and Buckland collections relating to Roman law, all in the Squire Law Library, a department of the Cambridge University Library; and the Slade-Baker collection of correspondence accumulated by the Slade-Baker firm of solicitors in Bewdley which is in Birmingham University Library.

== United States ==
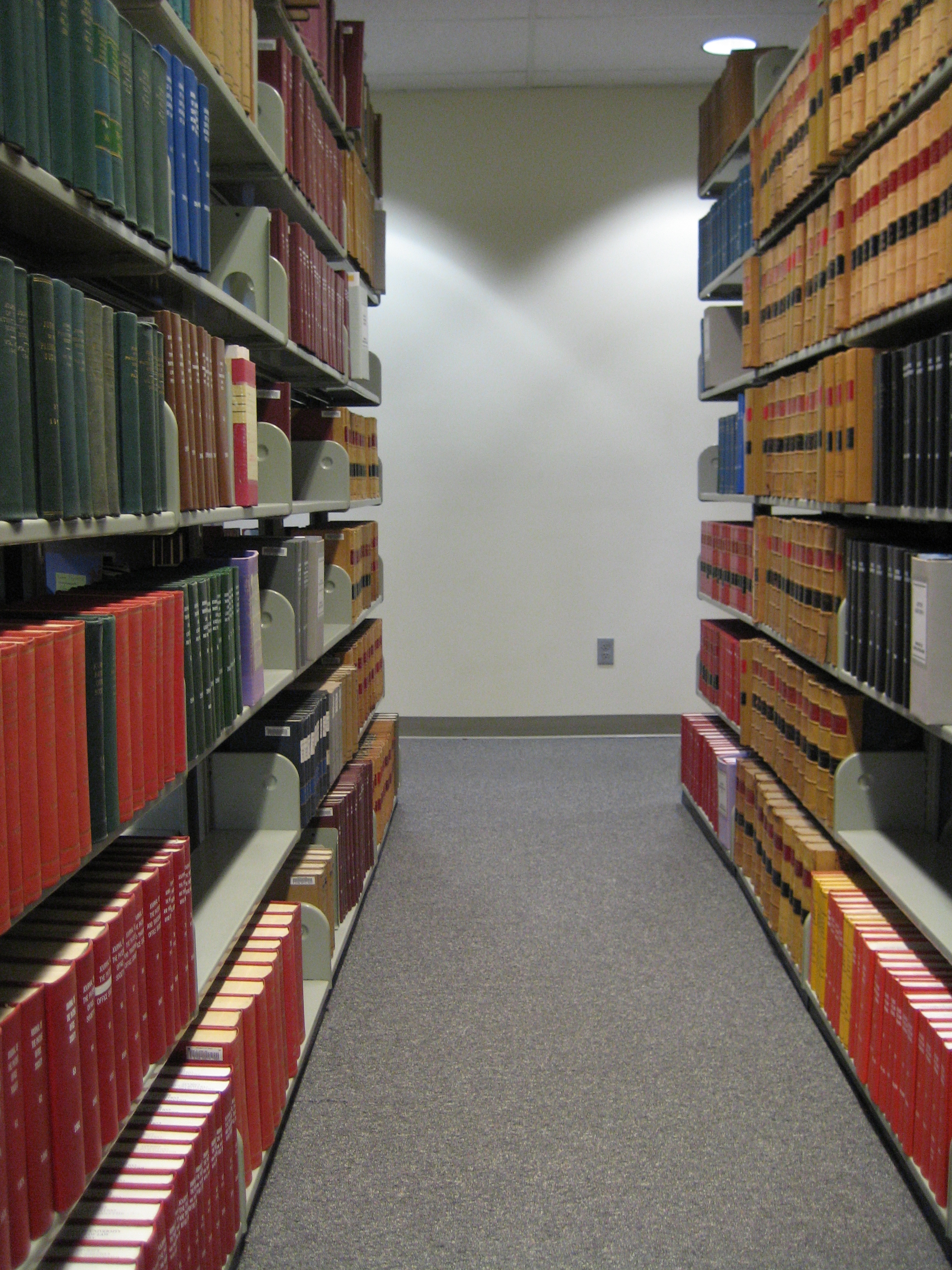
The stacks inside a typical university law library (Willamette University College of Law Library)

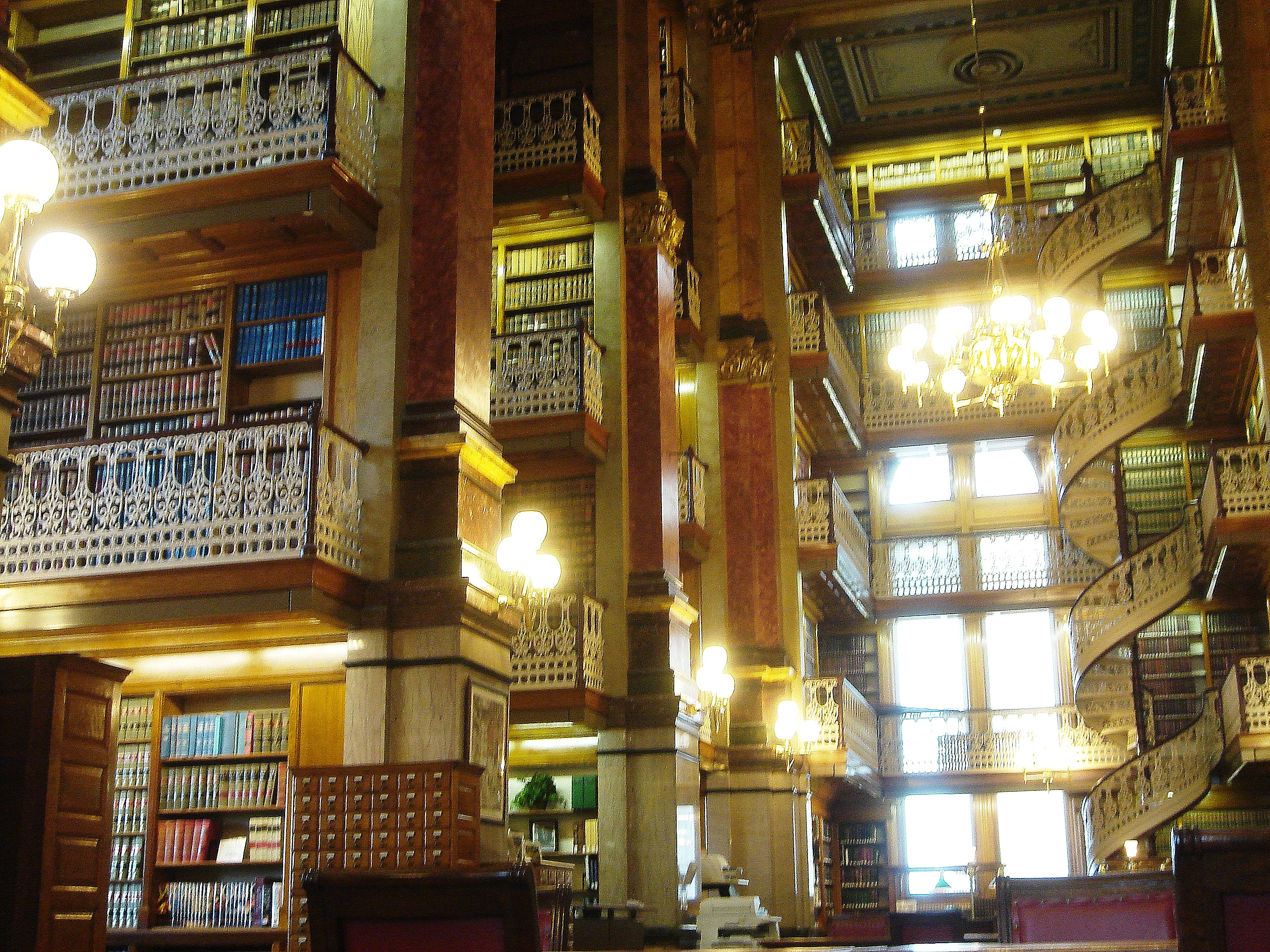
The Iowa State Capitol Law Library

=== Generally ===
The largest law libraries in the world are found in the United States. The world's largest law library is the Law Library of Congress, which holds over 2.9 million volumes. The world's largest academic law library is the library of Harvard Law School, which holds over 2 million volumes. By way of contrast, the largest law library in the United Kingdom is the Bodleian Law Library with a collection of over 550,000 volumes.

Broadly speaking, there are three categories of law libraries in the United States: academic, public, and private. Every law school accredited by the American Bar Association houses a law library. Public law libraries are available in many states, often in the local courthouses. Certain larger law firms maintain a private library for their own attorneys, but many firms in college towns and larger cities with universities simply dispatch their attorneys to local law schools to do legal research.

A typical law library holds a large number of works not seen in other libraries, including a full set of United States Reports, one or both of the unofficial U.S. Supreme Court reporters, the West National Reporter System, the West American Digest System, official reporters from various states, the Federal Register, volumes of American Jurisprudence, bound volumes containing issues of prominent law reviews from around the country, federal and state statutes and regulations (such as the United States Code and Code of Federal Regulations), and a variety of treatises, encyclopedias, looseleaf services, and practice guides.

Large law libraries may contain many additional materials covering topics such as: legal education, research, and writing; the history of the American legal system and profession; the history behind certain high-profile cases; techniques of oral argument; and the legislative history of important federal and state statutes.

Smaller law libraries typically maintain, at a minimum, one unofficial Supreme Court reporter; selected West national reporters and digests relevant to the library’s state; the United States Code; a limited selection of state-specific reporters and statutory compilations (if available for that state); and several state-specific treatises and practice guides. Most academic law library websites also provide publicly accessible legal research guides covering a wide range of legal topics.

In recent years, the advent of online legal research outlets such as FindLaw, Westlaw, LexisNexis, Bloomberg Law, and HeinOnline (or in Canada, CanLII) has reduced the need for some types of printed volumes like reporters and statutory compilations. A number of law libraries have therefore reduced the availability of printed works that can easily be found on the Internet, and have increased their own Internet availability. On the other hand, some university law libraries retain extensive historical collections going back to the earliest English reports. Many law libraries also participate in the Federal Depository Library Program which provides access to government information and documents to the public at no cost. This is particularly true of law school libraries as the library at any accredited law school is automatically eligible to become a depository library under the Program.

Most law libraries are members of the American Association of Law Libraries (AALL). As of 2010, the association has over 5,000 member libraries. Another important association for law libraries is the Special Libraries Association.

=== Academic law libraries ===
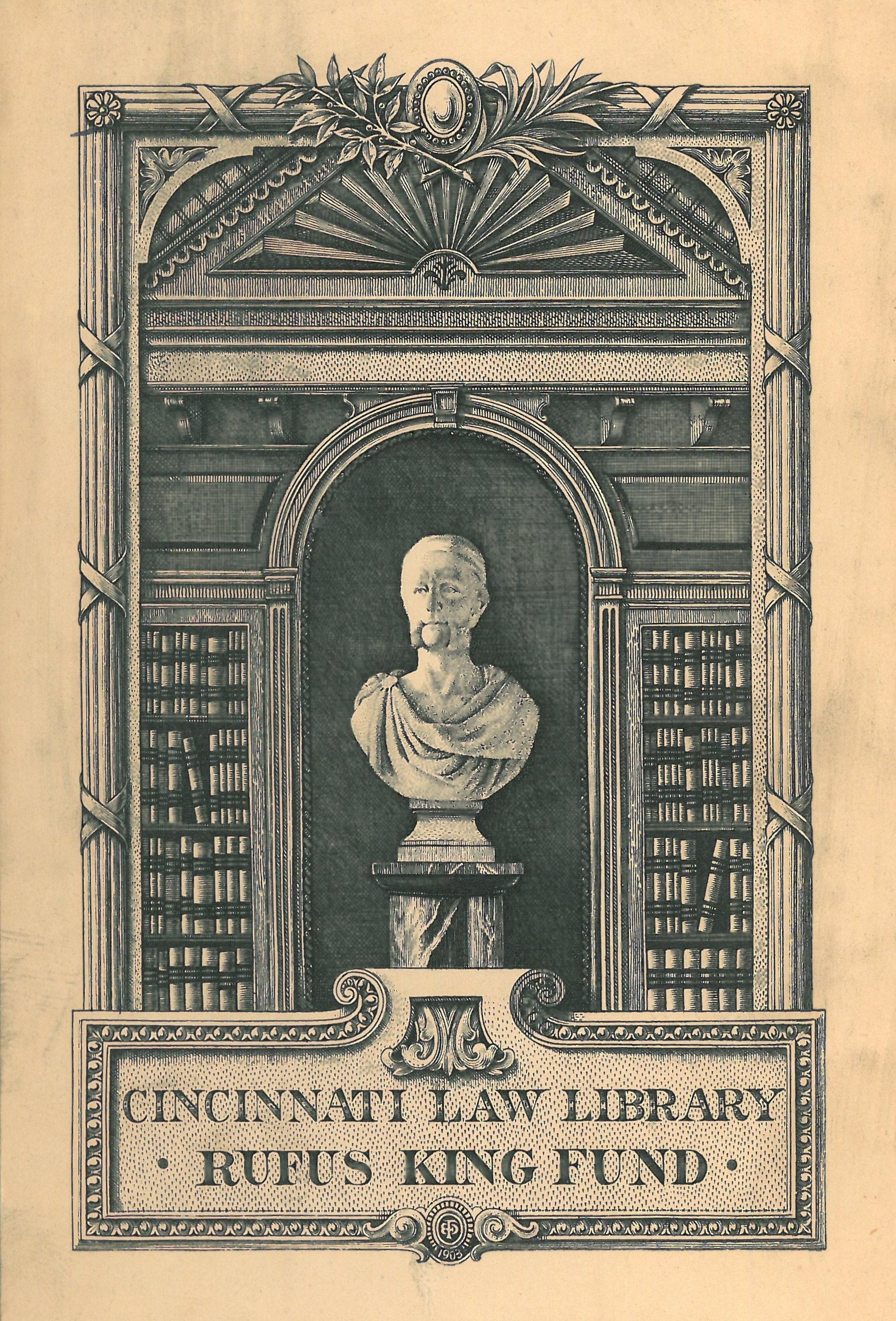
Bookplate of the Rufus King Fund, University of Cincinnati Law Library

A bookplate of the Iowa State Law Library

Every accredited American law school is required by the American Bar Association to have a law library meeting certain minimum specifications with respect to quantity and quality of materials available. Some law school libraries are kept in the same building as the general library, but many are either in the law school's building, or in a separate facility altogether.

As of 2015, the American Bar Association has propounded rules requiring each law school's law library to include among its holdings the following "core collection":

1. all reported federal court decisions and reported decisions of the highest appellate court of each state;
2. all federal codes and session laws, and at least one current annotated code for each state;
3. all current published treaties and international agreements of the United States;
4. all current published regulations (codified and uncodified) of the federal government and the codified regulations of the state in which the law school is located;
5. those federal and state administrative decisions appropriate to the programs of the law school;
6. U.S. Congressional materials appropriate to the programs of the law school;
7. significant secondary works necessary to support the programs of the law school, and
8. those tools, such as citators and periodical indexes, necessary to identify primary and secondary legal information and update primary legal information.

The ABA also requires a library's collection to meet the academic needs of the students and research and teaching needs of the faculty.

The ABA also establishes additional requirements, including that the law library must have a full-time director who holds both a law degree and a degree in library or information science, or an equivalent qualification accompanied by extensive experience in librarianship. The ABA also requires that the library have sufficient staff and facilities to attend to the needs of the institution.

Many academic law librarians participate in the AALL and specifically the Academic Law Libraries special interest section. In addition to providing library services, many "dual degree" (J.D. / M.L.I.S.) law librarians teach legal research to law students.

=== Public law libraries ===
Public law libraries in the United States exist in many states and in federal jurisdictions, such as federal agencies; many courthouses also have a law library. Public law libraries are publicly funded but may or may not be open to the public.

U.S. federal agencies have libraries and librarians who serve the legal research and other research needs of their employees and contractors, but these libraries are not open to the general public without an appointment. The Law Librarians' Society of Washington D.C. has a Special Interest Section, Federal Law Librarians. Some state and federal agencies maintain law libraries focusing on their regulatory areas. One prominent example is the United States Environmental Protection Agency, which runs a National Library Network providing access to specialized material to agency researchers and the general public.

The United States Supreme Court Building houses one of the most extensive federal public law libraries in the world, rivaled by the Law Library of Congress. Strictly speaking, neither the U.S. Supreme Court Library nor the Law Library of Congress is a public access law library; both, however, are government libraries funded by taxpayers, and accountable to the U.S. Supreme Court or to the U.S. Congress respectively. The Law Library of Congress does serve the public through various means, e.g. websites, social media services, and a physically accessible library.

New York and California are examples of states that have statutes requiring all their counties to maintain a public law library. While New York public access law libraries have remained relatively small, the LA Law Library in Los Angeles County is currently second in size behind the Law Library of Congress among U.S. public law libraries, with a collection at just under 1 million volumes, not including digital resources. Public law libraries are available, and in some cases are required, to offer law library and legal research services to the legal community consisting of legislators and other public officials, judges, and lawyers and to the general public, students, and to self-represented litigants. These public law libraries may be affiliated state or local courts. Some academic law libraries provide public access as well, especially in public universities.

Many public law librarians are members of the American Association of Law Libraries professional association, and specifically in the Government Law Libraries special interest section.

Public law librarians who have written books about providing legal research services to the public and managing public law libraries include Anthony Aycock, Roy Balleste, Joel Fishman, Paul D. Healey, Ellyssa Kroski, Laurie Selwyn, and Virginia Tucker.

=== Private law libraries ===
Some law firms and corporate legal departments maintain in-house libraries, the size and content of which vary depending on the practice area and needs of the organization. These libraries would rarely, if ever, be available to individuals outside the organization, although in some locales law firm librarians have informal lending agreements between firms. Private law libraries often participate in the AALL's Private Law Librarians & Information Professionals Special Interest Section.

== Foreign, comparative, and international law librarian ==
A foreign, comparative, and international law librarian, also known as FCIL librarian, is a law librarian specialist who works specifically with three primary varieties of extra-jurisdictional law. FCIL librarians work with foreign law, comparative law, and international law. Foreign laws are the laws of any international jurisdiction. Comparative laws are “the scholarly study of the similarities and differences between the legal systems of different jurisdictions.” International law is the law of international organizations, such as the United Nations, and the laws between nations, such as those established by treaty.
