= Primary and secondary legislation =

Two forms of law in democracies

Primary legislation and secondary legislation (the latter also called delegated legislation, subordinate legislation or legislative instrument) are two forms of law, created respectively by the legislative and executive branches of governments in representative democracies.

- Primary legislation generally consists of statutes, also known as "acts", that set out broad principles and rules, but may delegate specific authority to actors within the executive branch to make more specific laws under the aegis of the principal act.
- Those actors can then issue secondary legislation (often by order-in-council in parliamentary systems, or by regulatory agencies in presidential systems), creating legally enforceable regulations and the procedures for implementing them.

== By jurisdiction ==
=== Australia ===
In Australian law, primary legislation includes acts of the Commonwealth Parliament and state or territory parliaments. Secondary legislation, formally called legislative instruments, are regulations made according to law by the executive or judiciary or other specified bodies which have the effect of law. Secondary legislation amounts to about half of Commonwealth law by volume. Although it is made by the executive, secondary legislation is still scrutinised by parliament and can be disallowed by a resolution of either house of parliament.

=== Canada ===
In Canadian law, primary legislation (also called statute law) consists of acts of the Parliament of Canada and the legislatures of the provinces. Secondary legislation (also called regulation) includes laws made by federal or provincial Order in Council by virtue of an empowering statute previously made by the parliament or legislature.

=== European Union ===
Each member state of the European Union (EU) has its own laws, but EU law takes primacy in certain circumstances. The EU Treaties are the EU's primary legislation. These include the founding treaty, the 1957 Treaty of Rome, and all subsequent treaties, such as the Maastricht Treaty, Nice Treaty, and Lisbon Treaty. Secondary legislation is enacted under the treaties, taking various forms and can be either legislative or non-legislative.

The forms include binding regulations, directives, decisions, and non-binding recommendations and opinions:

- A regulation is a law which is binding in its entirety and directly applicable in all Member States without needing national implementation. EU citizens may have standing to pursue breaches of regulations and treaties, as in Van Gend en Loos v Nederlandse Administratie der Belastingen.
- A directive is addressed to the Member States as a framework for their legislation. It is "binding as to the result to be achieved", but Member States can choose their own form of implementation. EU citizens may have standing to challenge failures to implement, as in Francovich v Italy.
- A decision is a law that addresses a specific issue. Addressees may challenge a decision via judicial review.

Legislative acts are enacted via the legislative procedure, initiated by the Commission, and ultimately adopted by the Council and European Parliament acting in concert, which may also involve consultation with the European Economic and Social Committee and the European Committee of the Regions.

Non-legislative acts include implementing and delegated acts, such as those adopted by the Commission in pursuance of policy, which may involve so-called comitology committees. The Commission may act quasi-judicially in matters of EU competition law, a power defined in Article 101 and Article 102 of the Treaty on the Functioning of the European Union.

Privileged parties, such as Member States, EU institutions, and those with specific standing, may initiate litigation to challenge the validity of secondary legislation under the treaties.

=== Finland ===
In Finland, the practice is to delegate the making of secondary legislation ("decree", Finnish: asetus) mainly to the Finnish Government (the cabinet) as a whole, to individual ministries (made by the minister; e.g., where the change of legal position of persons is limited and technical), or to the President of the Republic (e.g., where implementing international treaty obligations do not require legislation). Delegation to government agencies is exceptional (e.g., when the need for regulation is technical and may change rapidly) and done with extra caution.

=== Hong Kong ===
In Hong Kong, primary legislation includes ordinances of the domestic Legislative Council, and Nationwide Laws of the People's Republic of China extended to Hong Kong by the National People's Congress. Subsidiary legislation in Hong Kong is made by the Executive Council or officials with delegated powers.

=== Spain ===
In Spain the primary legislation is composed of laws and organic laws. Organic laws are those which expand upon constitutionally-delegated matters, for instance electoral law. The government can also create laws, called decree-law (Decreto-Ley), for urgent matters and are restricted on what they can do. Decree-laws must be approved within a month by the Cortes Generales. The secondary legislation is called a legislative decree (Decreto legislativo); it can only delegate on the government for a given topic, within a time limit and only once.

=== United Kingdom ===
==== Primary legislation ====
In the United Kingdom, primary legislation can take a number of different forms:

- An act of Parliament
- Devolved primary legislation: an act of the Scottish Parliament, measure or act of the Senedd or act of the Northern Ireland Assembly
- An Order in Council made under the royal prerogative
- An Order in Council for Northern Ireland, making law under direct rule that in principle could have been made by a devolved legislature if one had been operational at the time
- Church of England measures – the instruments by which changes are made to legislation relating to the administration and organisation of the Church

UK primary legislation is generally outside the scope of judicial review; thus, unlike in many other countries, courts cannot "strike down" primary legislation. In relation to Acts of Parliament, this is a consequence of the constitutional doctrine of parliamentary sovereignty. An exception is that the Supreme Court has jurisdiction to find that devolved legislation is outside the legislative competence of the body that made it, for example because it relates to a matter reserved to the UK Parliament or is incompatible with a right under the European Convention on Human Rights.

==== Secondary legislation ====
In the United Kingdom, secondary legislation (also referred to as delegated legislation or subordinate legislation) is law made by an executive authority under powers delegated by an enactment of primary legislation, which grants the executive agency power to implement and administer the requirements of that primary legislation.

Forms of secondary legislation in the United Kingdom include:

- Statutory instruments made by the UK government in a variety of forms, most commonly Orders in Council, regulations, rules and orders. The form to be adopted is usually set out in the enabling act.
- Statutory rules and orders, for instruments similar to statutory instruments prior to 1948
- Church instruments, for instruments of the Archbishops of Canterbury and York under the authority of church measures
- Scottish statutory instruments made under the authority of legislation from the Scottish Parliament
- Welsh statutory instruments made under the authority of legislation from the Senedd, the National Assembly of Wales or the UK Parliament
- Statutory Rules of Northern Ireland made under the authority of legislation from the Northern Ireland Assembly

==== EU tertiary legislation ====
The European Union (Withdrawal) Act 2018 defines EU tertiary legislation in retained EU law after Brexit to mean:

- (a) any provision made under—
  - (i) an EU regulation,
  - (ii) a decision within the meaning of Article 288 of the Treaty on the Functioning of the European Union, or
  - (iii) an EU directive,
  by virtue of Article 290 or 291(2) of the Treaty on the Functioning of the European Union or former Article 202 of the Treaty establishing the European Community, or
- (b) any measure adopted in accordance with former Article 34(2)(c) of the Treaty on European Union to implement decisions under former Article 34(2)(c),

but does not include any such provision or measure which is an EU directive[.]

According to the explanatory notes accompanying the Act, this is meant to cover delegated and implementing acts that were not enacted via the European Union legislative procedure.

=== United States ===
The British English terminology of primary and secondary legislation is not used in American English, due to the American dislike of the British constitutional concept of the fusion of powers as inherently incompatible with due process and the rule of law (one of the great divergences between American and British political philosophy which led to the American Revolution). In contrast, the United States Constitution imposes a strict separation of powers. Therefore, the word legislation is typically used to refer only to acts of the legislative branch, and rarely the executive or the judicial branches. A similar relationship exists in state legal systems between laws, which are enacted by state legislatures, and regulations and policies, which are established by governmental bodies at the state and local levels. In a 2013 majority opinion of the US Supreme Court, Associate Justice Antonin Scalia explained:

[Legislative power] is vested exclusively in Congress [and judicial power] in the "one supreme Court" and "such inferior Courts as the Congress may from time to time ordain and establish" ... Agencies make rules ... and conduct adjudications ... and have done so since the beginning of the Republic. These activities take "legislative" and "judicial" forms, but they are exercises of—indeed, under our constitutional structure they must be exercises of—the "executive Power".

==== Act of Congress ====
In the United States, an Act of Congress at the federal level is the equivalent to the British concept of primary legislation. A statute that delegates authority to promulgate regulations to an agency is called an authorizing statute or delegation of rulemaking authority. All Acts of Congress are recorded in the United States Statutes at Large, and the permanent active ones are reorganized and codified into the United States Code.

==== Regulations "with the force of law" ====
In the United States, a rule or regulation is a directive promulgated by an executive branch agency of the US federal government pursuant to authority delegated by an Act of Congress—often with the qualifier that it is a rule given "the force of law" by the authorizing statute. Most regulations are codified into the Code of Federal Regulations. These are secondary legislation.

The body of law that governs agencies' exercise of rulemaking powers is called "administrative law", which derives primarily from the Administrative Procedure Act (APA) and decisions interpreting it. In addition to controlling "quasi-legislative" agency action, the APA also controls "quasi-judicial" actions in which an agency acts analogously to a court, rather than a legislature.

The APA also mandates a 60-day comment and review period before new rules or regulations can come into effect. In addition, regulations have to be issued by a Senate-confirmed executive branch officer (which excludes the President).

==== Executive orders and memos ====
Presidential executive orders and memos would constitute a level of legislation below secondary legislation (i.e. the rules and regulations issued in accordance with the APA by a Senate-confirmed executive branch officer). Memos issued by executive branch officers often have the full force of law. Memos sometimes constitute interpretive guidance of statutes or regulations, and this can have a significant impact on how a law is interpreted and implemented. Memos, unlike regulations, do not go through the 60-day APA process of comment and review, and usually go into effect immediately. Executive orders are issued in a manner similar to memos. The scope and authority of Presidential executive orders under Article Two of the United States Constitution is currently being debated.

== See also ==
- Executive order (United States) – Federal administrative instruction issued by the U.S. president
- Rulemaking – Process by which executive branch agencies create regulations
- Evidence-based legislation – Decisions and practices that use evidence to enact laws
- Primary authority
- Secondary authority
- Enabling act
