= William Fargo Kip =

American lawyer and librarian

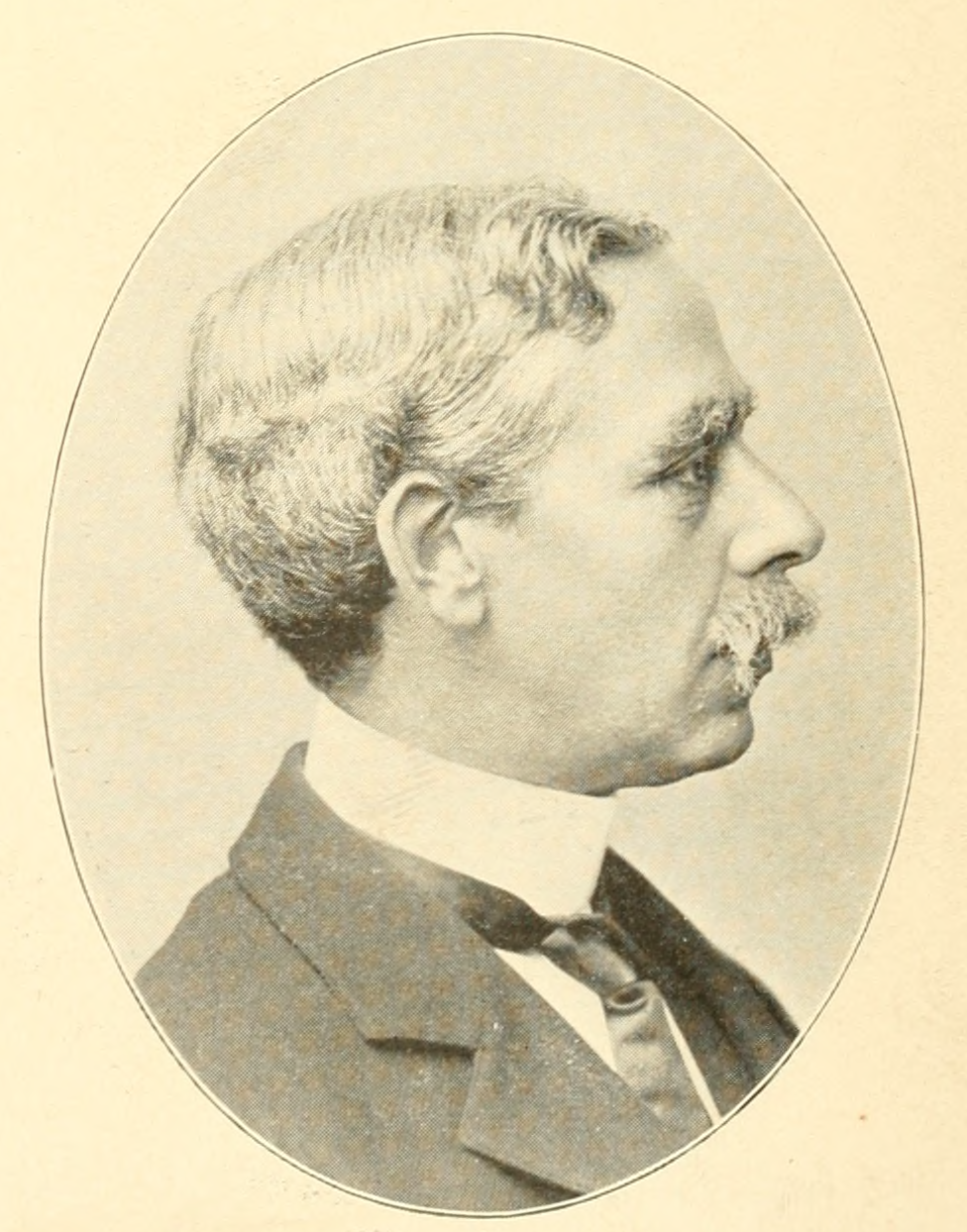
- Born: April 8, 1855
- Died: July 5, 1905 (aged 50)
- Alma mater: Harvard Law School

William Fargo Kip (April 8, 1855 – July 5, 1905) was an American lawyer and legal librarian.

Kip was born in Buffalo, New York, the second son of the late Henry Kip, a distinguished member of the Kip family of New York City. He was educated at Phillips Exeter Academy and Harvard College, graduating in the class of 1876. He spent a year traveling abroad and returned in 1877 to enter Harvard Law School, where he spent a year. The next year, he entered Columbia Law School and received the degree of LED in 1879. He practiced his profession in Buffalo from 1881 to 1891. During this period, he was deeply interested in forwarding the cause of civil service reform and was, for some years, a civil service examiner for the city of Buffalo.

Kip took an active part in politics, being a Democrat, and was, in 1892, the confidential secretary of Ex-President Cleveland. In 1891, he went to practice law in New York City. In 1896, after a competitive examination open to all lawyers, he was appointed assistant librarian of the appellate division of the New York Supreme Court, and in 1898 he was appointed the librarian of one of the most complete law libraries in the world, that of the bar association of the city of New York. Despite his failing health, Kip gained a high reputation in this post.

Kip died unmarried in Provincetown. His brothers, Henry W. Kip of East Aurora, New York, and Charles H. Kip, a member of the Boston school board, survived him.

This article incorporates text from Boston Globe, a publication from July 7, 1905, now in the public domain in the United States.
