= Law of the United States =

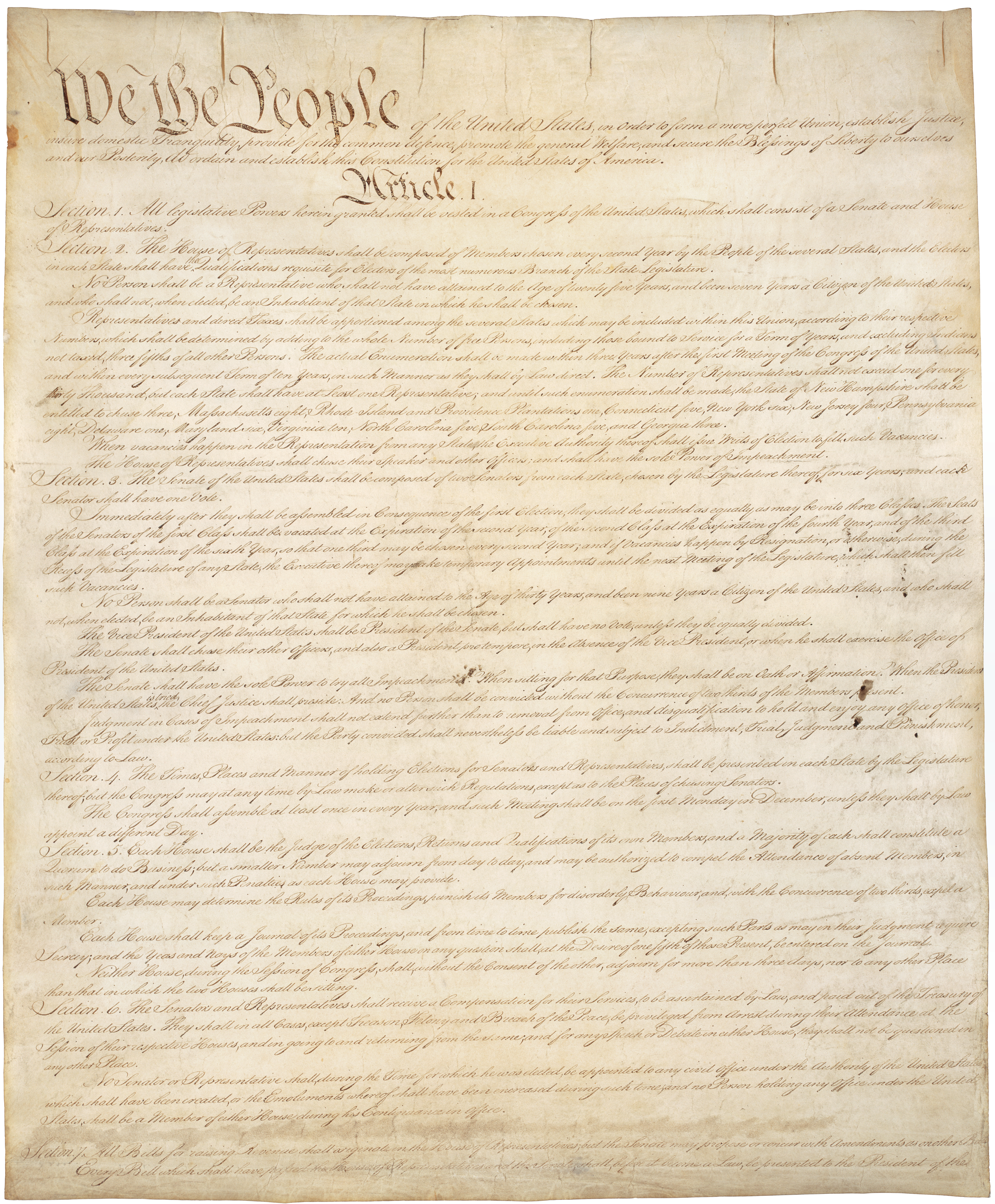
Constitution of the United States

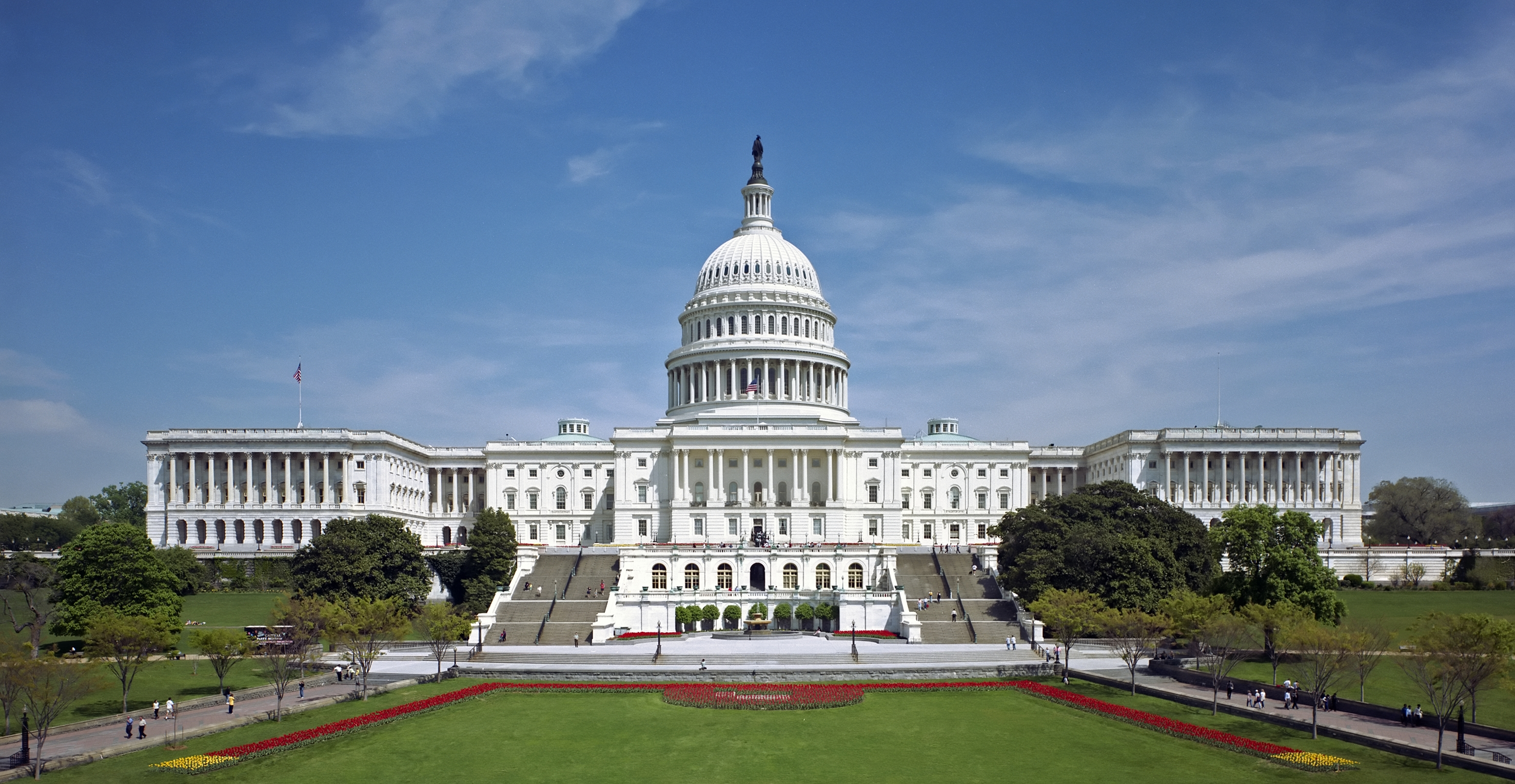
The United States Congress, the federal bicameral legislature, enacts federal statutes in accordance with the Constitution.

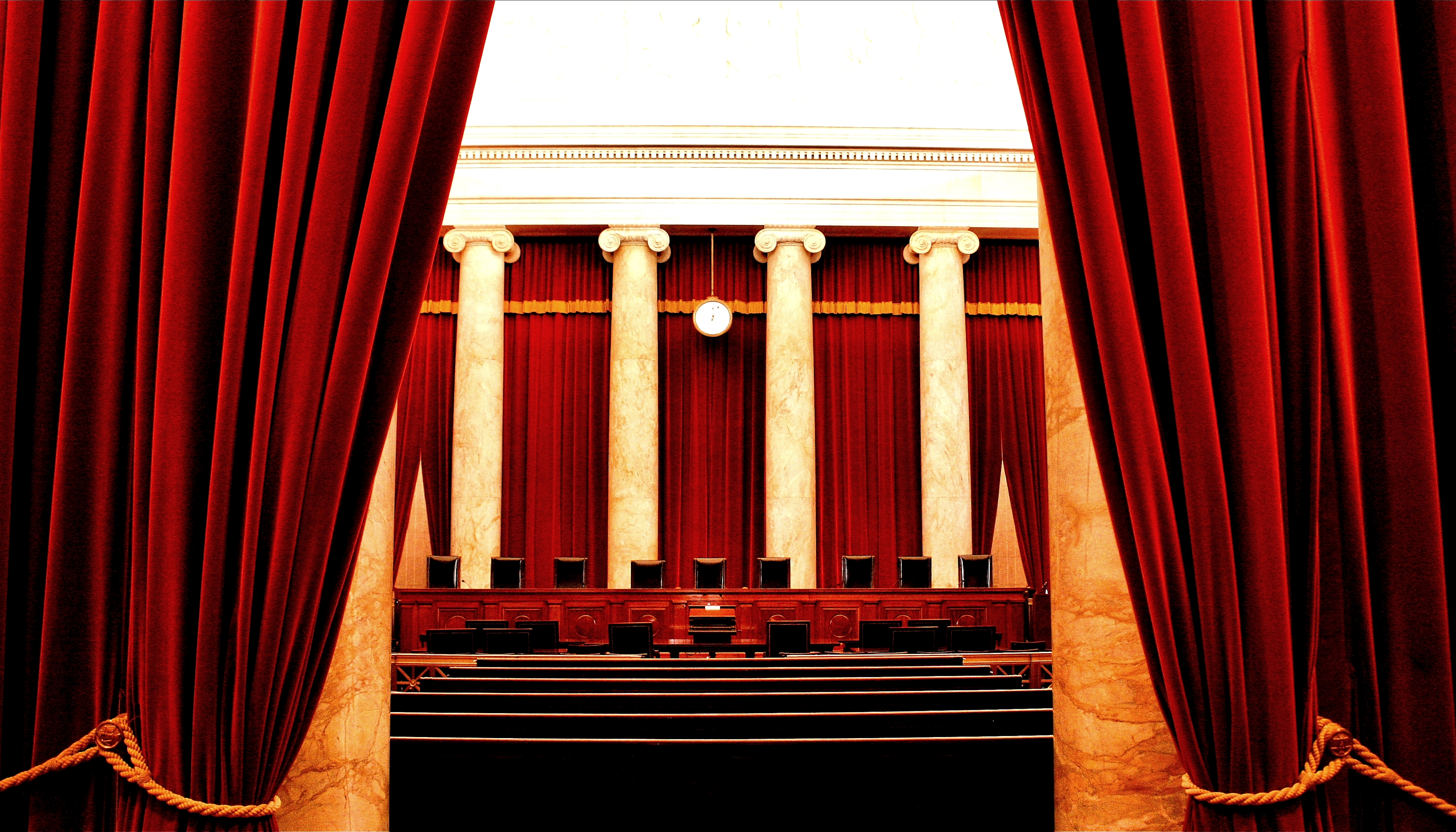
The Supreme Court of the United States is the highest judicial authority in interpreting federal law, including the federal Constitution, federal statutes, and federal regulations.

The law of the United States comprises many levels of codified and uncodified forms of law. The nation's supreme law is the Constitution of the United States, which prescribes the foundation of the federal government and its relationship with state governments, as well as various civil liberties. Under the Constitution, federal law includes acts of Congress, treaties ratified by the Senate, regulations promulgated by the executive branch, and case law originating from the federal judiciary. The United States Code is the official compilation and codification of general and permanent federal statutory law.

The Constitution provides that it, as well as federal laws and treaties that are made pursuant to it, preempt conflicting state and territorial laws. However, the scope of federal preemption is limited because the scope of federal power is not universal. In the dual sovereign system of American federalism, states are the plenary sovereigns, each with their own constitution, while the federal sovereign possesses only the limited supreme authority enumerated in the Constitution. States may grant their citizens broader rights than the federal Constitution as long as they do not infringe on any federal constitutional rights. Law experienced by citizens on a daily basis such as contract, tort, property, probate, criminal and family law is governed primarily by state law, which varies across the nation.

At both the federal and state levels, with the exception of the legal system of Louisiana, the law of the United States is largely derived from the common law system of English law, which was in force in British America at the time of the American Revolutionary War. American law has diverged greatly from its English ancestor both in terms of substance and procedure yet retains common law principles such as purposive interpretation and stare decisis even in codified statutes.

== General overview ==
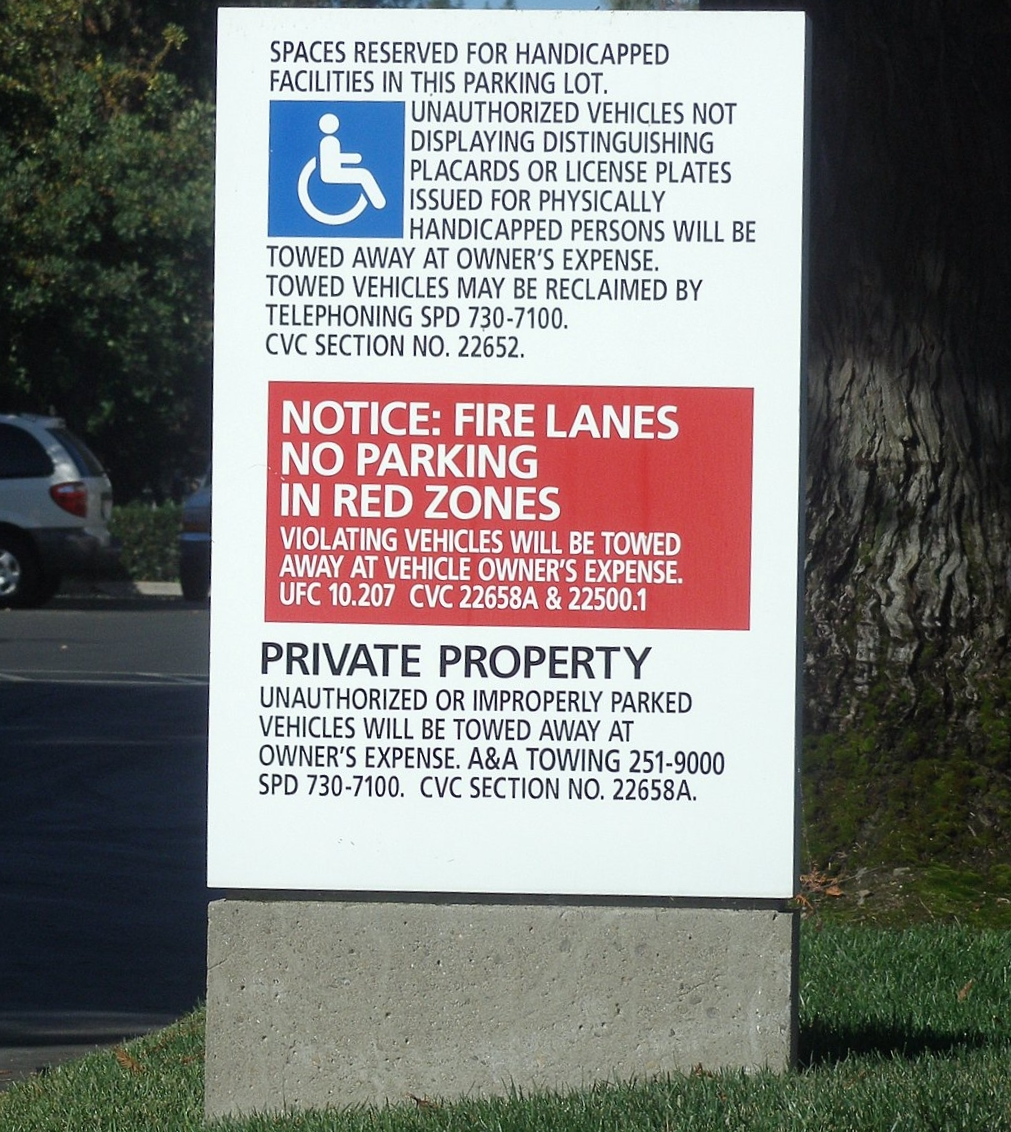
Law affects every aspect of American life, including parking lots. Note the citations to statutes on the sign.

=== Sources of law ===
In the United States, the law is derived from five sources: constitutional law, statutory law, treaties, administrative regulations, and the common law (which includes case law).

=== Constitutionality ===
If Congress enacts a statute that conflicts with the Constitution, state or federal courts may rule that law to be unconstitutional and declare it invalid.

Notably, a statute does not automatically disappear merely because it has been found unconstitutional; it may, however, be deleted by a subsequent statute. Many federal and state statutes have remained on the books for decades after they were ruled to be unconstitutional. However, under the principle of stare decisis, a lower court that enforces a statute of a kind previously declared unconstitutional will risk reversal by the Supreme Court. Conversely, any court that refuses to enforce a statute previously upheld as constitutional by higher courts risks being reversed by the Supreme Court.

=== American common law ===
The United States and most Commonwealth countries are heirs to the common law legal tradition of English law. Certain practices traditionally allowed under English common law were expressly outlawed by the Constitution, such as bills of attainder and general search warrants.

As common law courts, U.S. courts have inherited the principle of stare decisis. American judges, like common law judges elsewhere, not only apply the law, they also make the law, to the extent that their decisions in the cases before them become precedent for decisions in future cases.

The actual substance of English law was formally "received" into the United States in several ways. First, all U.S. states except Louisiana have enacted "reception statutes" which generally state that the common law of England (particularly judge-made law) is the law of the state to the extent that it is not repugnant to domestic law or indigenous conditions. Some reception statutes impose a specific cutoff date for reception, such as the date of a colony's founding, while others are deliberately vague. Thus, contemporary U.S. courts often cite pre-Revolution cases when discussing the evolution of an ancient judge-made common law principle into its modern form, such as the heightened duty of care traditionally imposed upon common carriers.

Second, a small number of important British statutes in effect at the time of the Revolution have been independently reenacted by U.S. states. Two examples are the Statute of Frauds (still widely known in the U.S. by that name) and the Statute of 13 Elizabeth (the ancestor of the Uniform Fraudulent Transfer Act). Such English statutes are still regularly cited in contemporary American cases interpreting their modern American descendants.

Despite the presence of reception statutes, much of contemporary American common law has diverged significantly from English common law. Although the courts of the various Commonwealth nations are often influenced by each other's rulings, American courts rarely follow post-Revolution precedents from England or the British Commonwealth.

Early on, American courts, even after the Revolution, often did cite contemporary English cases, because appellate decisions from many American courts were not regularly reported until the mid-19th century. Lawyers and judges used English legal materials to fill the gap. Citations to English decisions gradually disappeared during the 19th century as American courts developed their own principles to resolve the legal problems of the American people. The number of published volumes of American reports soared from eighteen in 1810 to over 8,000 by 1910. By 1879 one of the delegates to the California constitutional convention was already complaining: "Now, when we require them to state the reasons for a decision, we do not mean they shall write a hundred pages of detail. We [do] not mean that they shall include the small cases, and impose on the country all this fine judicial literature, for the Lord knows we have got enough of that already."

Today, in the words of Stanford law professor Lawrence M. Friedman: "American cases rarely cite foreign materials. Courts occasionally cite a British classic or two, a famous old case, or a nod to Blackstone; but current British law almost never gets any mention." Foreign law has never been cited as binding precedent, but as a reflection of the shared values of Anglo-American civilization or even Western civilization in general.

== Levels of law ==
=== Federal law ===
Federal law originates with the Constitution, which gives Congress the power to introduce legislation that the president may sign into law for certain limited purposes like regulating interstate commerce. The United States Code is the official compilation and codification of the general and permanent federal statutes. Many statutes give executive branch agencies the power to create regulations, which are published in the Federal Register and codified into the Code of Federal Regulations. From 1984 to 2024, regulations generally also carried the force of law under the Chevron doctrine, but are now subject only to a lesser form of judicial deference known as Skidmore deference. Many lawsuits turn on the meaning of a federal statute or regulation, and judicial interpretations of such meaning carry legal force under the principle of stare decisis.

During the 18th and 19th centuries, federal law traditionally focused on areas where there was an express grant of power to the federal government in the federal Constitution, like the military, money, foreign relations (especially international treaties), tariffs, intellectual property (specifically patents and copyrights), and mail. Since the start of the 20th century, broad interpretations of the Commerce and Spending Clauses of the Constitution have enabled federal law to expand into areas like aviation, telecommunications, railroads, pharmaceuticals, antitrust, and trademarks. In some areas, like aviation and railroads, the federal government has developed a comprehensive scheme that preempts virtually all state law, while in others, like family law, a relatively small number of federal statutes (generally covering interstate and international situations) interacts with a much larger body of state law. In areas like antitrust, trademark, and employment law, there are powerful laws at both the federal and state levels that coexist with each other. In a handful of areas like insurance, Congress has enacted laws expressly refusing to regulate them as long as the states have laws regulating them (see, e.g., the McCarran–Ferguson Act).

==== Statutes ====
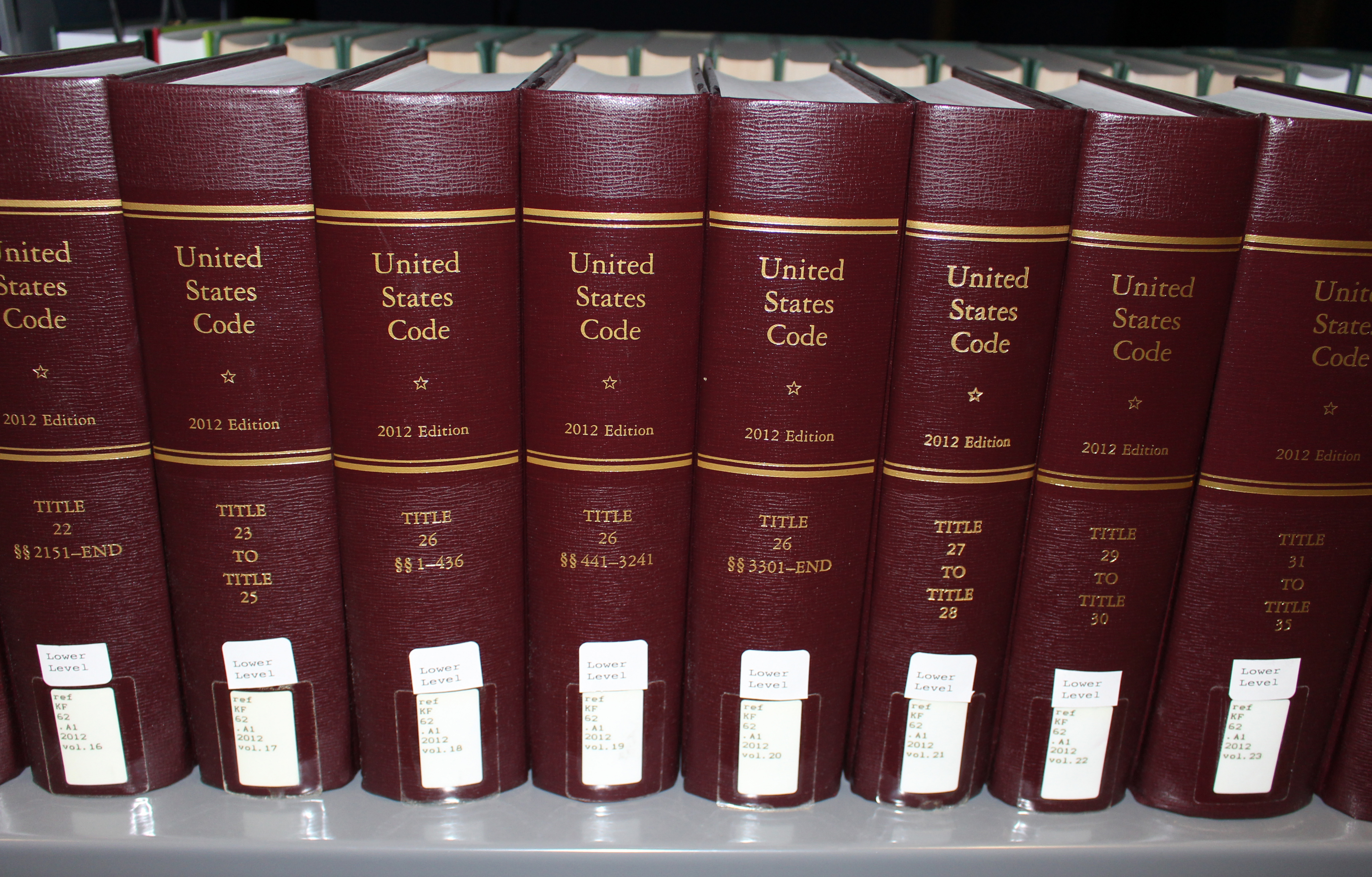
The United States Code, the codification of federal statutory law

After the president signs a bill into law (or Congress enacts it over the president's veto), it is delivered to the Office of the Federal Register (OFR) of the National Archives and Records Administration (NARA) where it is assigned a law number, and prepared for publication as a slip law. Public laws, but not private laws, are also given legal statutory citation by the OFR. At the end of each session of Congress, the slip laws are compiled into bound volumes called the United States Statutes at Large, and they are known as session laws. The Statutes at Large present a chronological arrangement of the laws in the exact order that they have been enacted.

Public laws are incorporated into the United States Code, which is a codification of all general and permanent laws of the United States. The main edition is published every six years by the Office of the Law Revision Counsel of the House of Representatives, and cumulative supplements are published annually. The U.S. Code is arranged by subject matter, and it shows the present status of laws (with amendments already incorporated in the text) that have been amended on one or more occasions.

==== Regulations ====
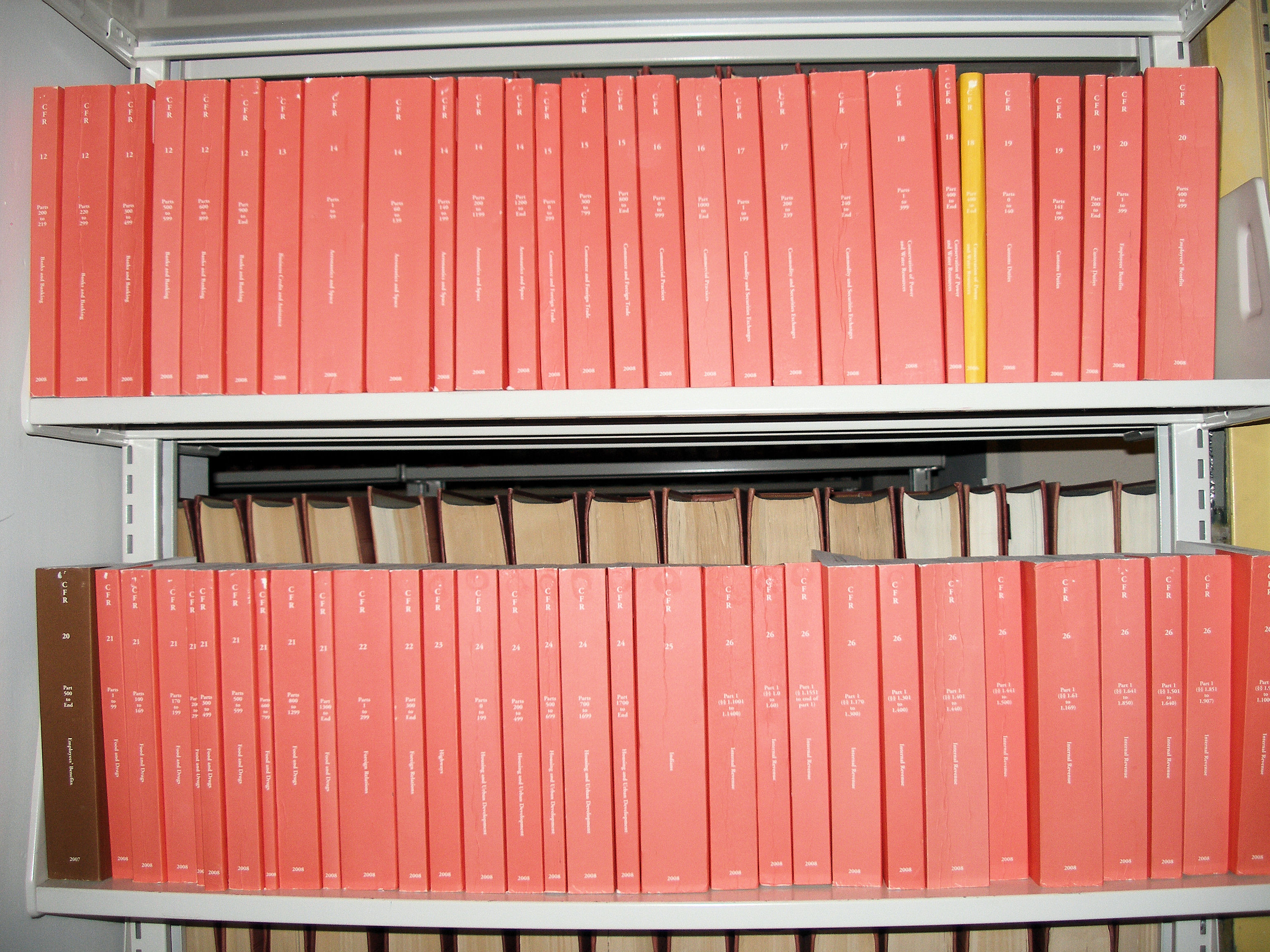
The Code of Federal Regulations, the codification of federal administrative law

Congress often enacts statutes that grant broad rulemaking authority to federal agencies. Often, Congress is simply too gridlocked to draft detailed statutes that explain how the agency should react to every possible situation, or Congress believes the agency's technical specialists are best equipped to deal with particular fact situations as they arise. Therefore, federal agencies are authorized to promulgate regulations.

Regulations are adopted pursuant to the Administrative Procedure Act (APA). Regulations are first proposed and published in the Federal Register (FR or Fed. Reg.) and subject to a public comment period. Eventually, after a period for public comment and revisions based on comments received, a final version is published in the Federal Register. The regulations are codified and incorporated into the Code of Federal Regulations (CFR) which is published once a year on a rolling schedule.

Besides regulations formally promulgated under the APA, federal agencies also frequently promulgate an enormous amount of forms, manuals, policy statements, letters, and rulings. These documents may be considered by a court as persuasive authority as to how a particular statute or regulation may be interpreted (known as Skidmore deference), but are not entitled to Chevron deference.

==== Common law, case law, and precedent ====
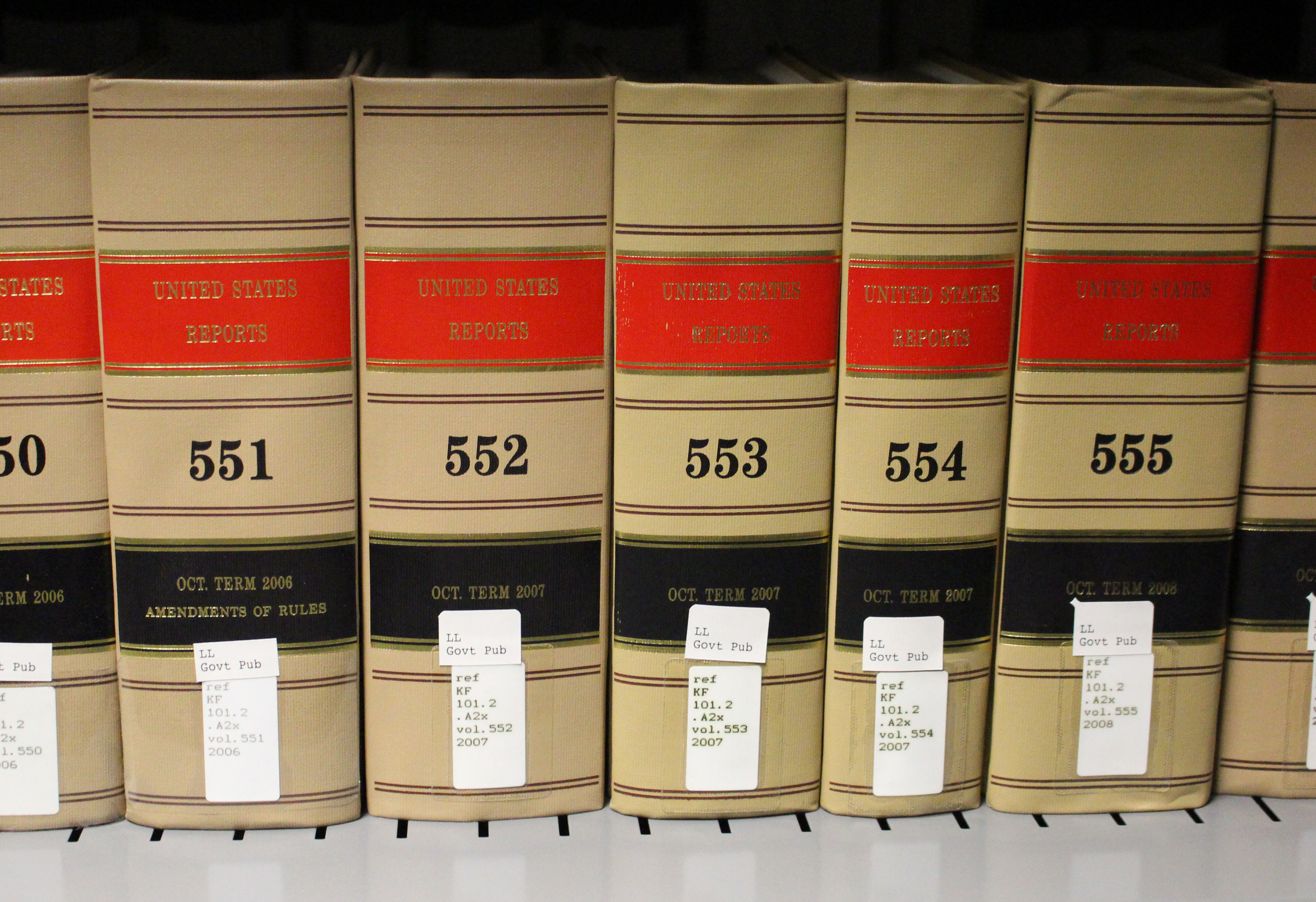
The United States Reports, the official reporter of the U.S. Supreme Court

Unlike the situation with the states, there is no plenary reception statute at the federal level that continued the common law and thereby granted federal courts the power to formulate legal precedent like their English predecessors. Federal courts are solely creatures of the federal Constitution and the federal Judiciary acts. However, it is universally accepted that the Founding Fathers of the United States, by vesting "judicial power" into the Supreme Court and the inferior federal courts in Article Three of the United States Constitution, thereby vested in them the implied judicial power of common law courts to formulate persuasive precedent; this power was widely accepted, understood, and recognized by the Founding Fathers at the time the Constitution was ratified. Several legal scholars have argued that the federal judicial power to decide "cases or controversies" necessarily includes the power to decide the precedential effect of those cases and controversies.

The difficult question is whether federal judicial power extends to formulating binding precedent through strict adherence to the rule of stare decisis. This is where the act of deciding a case becomes a limited form of lawmaking in itself, in that an appellate court's rulings will thereby bind itself and lower courts in future cases (and therefore also implicitly binds all persons within the court's jurisdiction). Prior to a major change to federal court rules in 2007, about one-fifth of federal appellate cases were published and thereby became binding precedents, while the rest were unpublished and bound only the parties to each case.

As federal judge Alex Kozinski has pointed out, binding precedent as we know it today simply did not exist at the time the Constitution was framed. Judicial decisions were not consistently, accurately, and faithfully reported on both sides of the Atlantic (reporters often simply rewrote or failed to publish decisions which they disliked), and the United Kingdom lacked a coherent court hierarchy prior to the end of the 19th century. Furthermore, English judges in the eighteenth century subscribed to now-obsolete natural law theories of law, by which law was believed to have an existence independent of what individual judges said. Judges saw themselves as merely declaring the law which had always theoretically existed, and not as making the law. Therefore, a judge could reject another judge's opinion as simply an incorrect statement of the law, in the way that scientists regularly reject each other's conclusions as incorrect statements of the laws of science.

In turn, according to Kozinski's analysis, the contemporary rule of binding precedent became possible in the U.S. in the nineteenth century only after the creation of a clear court hierarchy (under the Judiciary Acts), and the beginning of regular verbatim publication of U.S. appellate decisions by West Publishing. The rule gradually developed, case-by-case, as an extension of the judiciary's public policy of effective judicial administration (that is, in order to efficiently exercise the judicial power). The rule of binding precedent is generally justified today as a matter of public policy, first, as a matter of fundamental fairness, and second, because in the absence of case law, it would be completely unworkable for every minor issue in every legal case to be briefed, argued, and decided from first principles (such as relevant statutes, constitutional provisions, and underlying public policies), which in turn would create hopeless inefficiency, instability, and unpredictability, and thereby undermine the rule of law. The contemporary form of the rule is descended from Justice Louis Brandeis's "landmark dissent in 1932's Burnet v. Coronado Oil & Gas Co.", which "catalogued the Court's actual overruling practices in such a powerful manner that his attendant stare decisis analysis immediately assumed canonical authority."

Here is a typical exposition of how public policy supports the rule of binding precedent in a 2008 majority opinion signed by Justice Breyer:

Justice Brandeis once observed that "in most matters it is more important that the applicable rule of law be settled than that it be settled right." Burnet v. Coronado Oil & Gas Co. [...] To overturn a decision settling one such matter simply because we might believe that decision is no longer "right" would inevitably reflect a willingness to reconsider others. And that willingness could itself threaten to substitute disruption, confusion, and uncertainty for necessary legal stability. We have not found here any factors that might overcome these considerations.

It is now sometimes possible, over time, for a line of precedents to drift from the express language of any underlying statutory or constitutional texts until the courts' decisions establish doctrines that were not considered by the texts' drafters. This trend has been strongly evident in federal substantive due process and Commerce Clause decisions. Originalists and political conservatives, such as Associate Justice Antonin Scalia have criticized this trend as anti-democratic.

Under the doctrine of Erie Railroad Co. v. Tompkins (1938), there is no general federal common law. Although federal courts can create federal common law in the form of case law, such law must be linked one way or another to the interpretation of a particular federal constitutional provision, statute, or regulation (which was either enacted as part of the Constitution or pursuant to constitutional authority). Federal courts lack the plenary power possessed by state courts to simply make up law, which the latter are able to do in the absence of constitutional or statutory provisions replacing the common law. Only in a few narrow limited areas, like maritime law, has the Constitution expressly authorized the continuation of English common law at the federal level (meaning that in those areas federal courts can continue to make law as they see fit, subject to the limitations of stare decisis).

The other major implication of the Erie doctrine is that federal courts cannot dictate the content of state law when there is no federal issue (and thus no federal supremacy issue) in a case. When hearing claims under state law pursuant to diversity jurisdiction, federal trial courts must apply the statutory and decisional law of the state in which they sit, as if they were a court of that state, even if they believe that the relevant state law is irrational or just bad public policy.

Under Erie, such federal deference to state law applies only in one direction: state courts are not bound by federal interpretations of state law. Similarly, state courts are also not bound by most federal interpretations of federal law. In the vast majority of state courts, interpretations of federal law from federal courts of appeals and district courts can be cited as persuasive authority, but state courts are not bound by those interpretations. The U.S. Supreme Court has never squarely addressed the issue, but has signaled in dicta that it sides with this rule. Therefore, in those states, there is only one federal court that binds all state courts as to the interpretation of federal law and the federal Constitution: the U.S. Supreme Court itself.

=== State and territory law ===
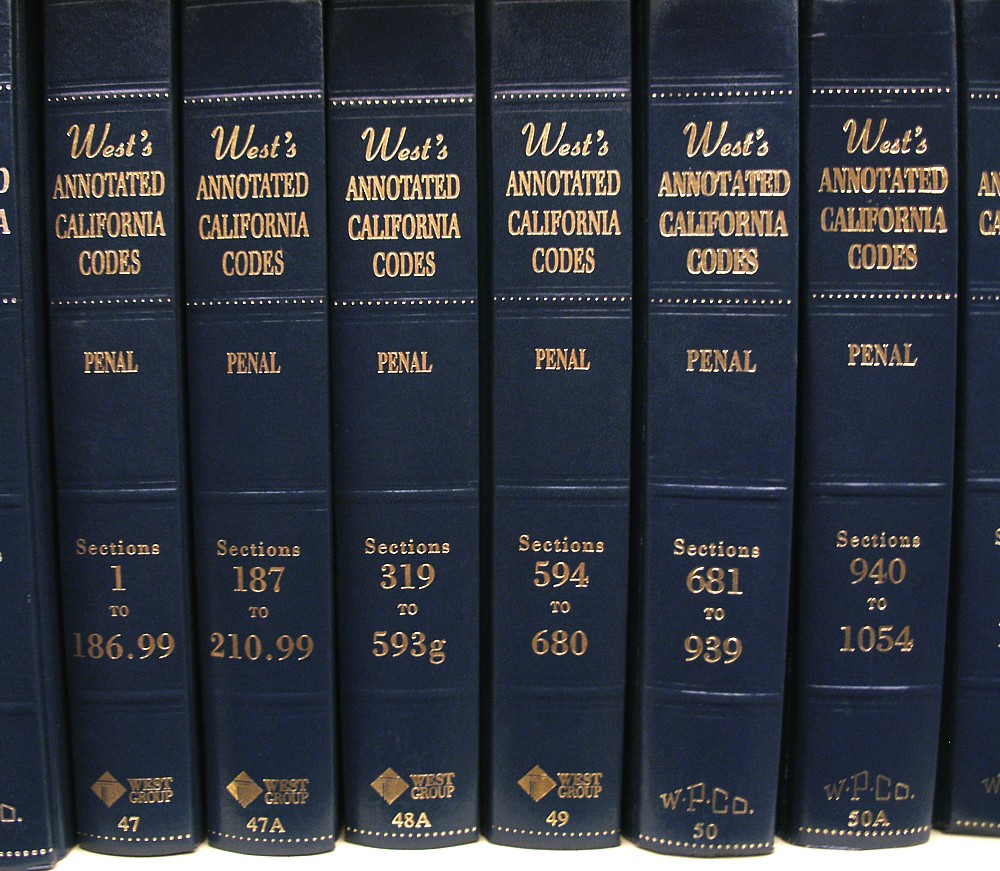
Volumes of the Thomson West annotated version of the California Penal Code, the codification of criminal law in the state of California

The fifty American states are separate sovereigns, with their own state constitutions, state governments, and state courts. All states have a legislative branch which enacts state statutes, an executive branch that promulgates state regulations pursuant to statutory authorization, and a judicial branch that applies, interprets, and occasionally overturns both state statutes and regulations, as well as local ordinances. They retain plenary power to make laws covering anything not preempted by the federal Constitution, federal statutes, or international treaties ratified by the federal Senate. Normally, state supreme courts are the final interpreters of state constitutions and state law, unless their interpretation itself presents a federal issue, in which case a decision may be appealed to the U.S. Supreme Court by way of a petition for writ of certiorari. State laws have dramatically diverged in the centuries since independence, to the extent that the United States cannot be regarded as one legal system as to the majority of types of law traditionally under state control, but must be regarded as 50 separate systems of tort law, family law, property law, contract law, criminal law, and so on.

Most cases are litigated in state courts and involve claims and defenses under state laws. In a 2018 report, the National Center for State Courts' Court Statistics Project found that state trial courts received 83.8 million newly filed cases in 2018, which consisted of 44.4 million traffic cases, 17.0 million criminal cases, 16.4 million civil cases, 4.7 million domestic relations cases, and 1.2 million juvenile cases. In 2018, state appellate courts received 234,000 new cases. By way of comparison, all federal district courts in 2016 together received only about 274,552 new civil cases, 79,787 new criminal cases, and 833,515 bankruptcy cases, while federal appellate courts received 53,649 new cases.

==== State legal systems ====
- Law of Alabama
- Law of Alaska
- Law of Arizona
- Law of Arkansas
- Law of California
- Law of Colorado
- Law of Connecticut
- Law of Delaware
- Law of Florida
- Law of Georgia
- Law of Hawaii
- Law of Idaho
- Law of Illinois
- Law of Indiana
- Law of Iowa
- Law of Kansas
- Law of Kentucky
- Law of Louisiana
- Law of Maine
- Law of Maryland
- Law of Massachusetts
- Law of Michigan
- Law of Minnesota
- Law of Mississippi
- Law of Missouri
- Law of Montana
- Law of Nebraska
- Law of Nevada
- Law of New Hampshire
- Law of New Jersey
- Law of New Mexico
- Law of New York
- Law of North Carolina
- Law of North Dakota
- Law of Ohio
- Law of Oklahoma
- Law of Oregon
- Law of Pennsylvania
- Law of Rhode Island
- Law of South Carolina
- Law of South Dakota
- Law of Tennessee
- Law of Texas
- Law of Utah
- Law of Vermont
- Law of Virginia
- Law of Washington
- Law of West Virginia
- Law of Wisconsin
- Law of Wyoming

==== Territorial legal systems ====
- Law of American Samoa
- Law of Guam
- Law of the Northern Mariana Islands
- Law of Puerto Rico
- Law of the U.S. Virgin Islands

=== Local law ===
States have delegated lawmaking powers to thousands of agencies, townships, counties, cities, and special districts. And all the state constitutions, statutes and regulations (as well as all the ordinances and regulations promulgated by local entities) are subject to judicial interpretation like their federal counterparts.

It is common for residents of major U.S. metropolitan areas to live under six or more layers of special districts as well as a town or city, and a county or township (in addition to the federal and state governments). Thus, at any given time, the average American citizen is subject to the rules and regulations of several dozen different agencies at the federal, state, and local levels, depending upon one's current location and behavior.

== Legal subjects ==
American lawyers draw a fundamental distinction between procedural law (which controls the procedure by which legal rights and duties are vindicated) and substantive law (the actual substance of law, which is usually expressed in the form of various legal rights and duties). (The remainder of this article requires the reader to be already familiar with the contents of the separate article on state law.)

=== Criminal law and procedure ===
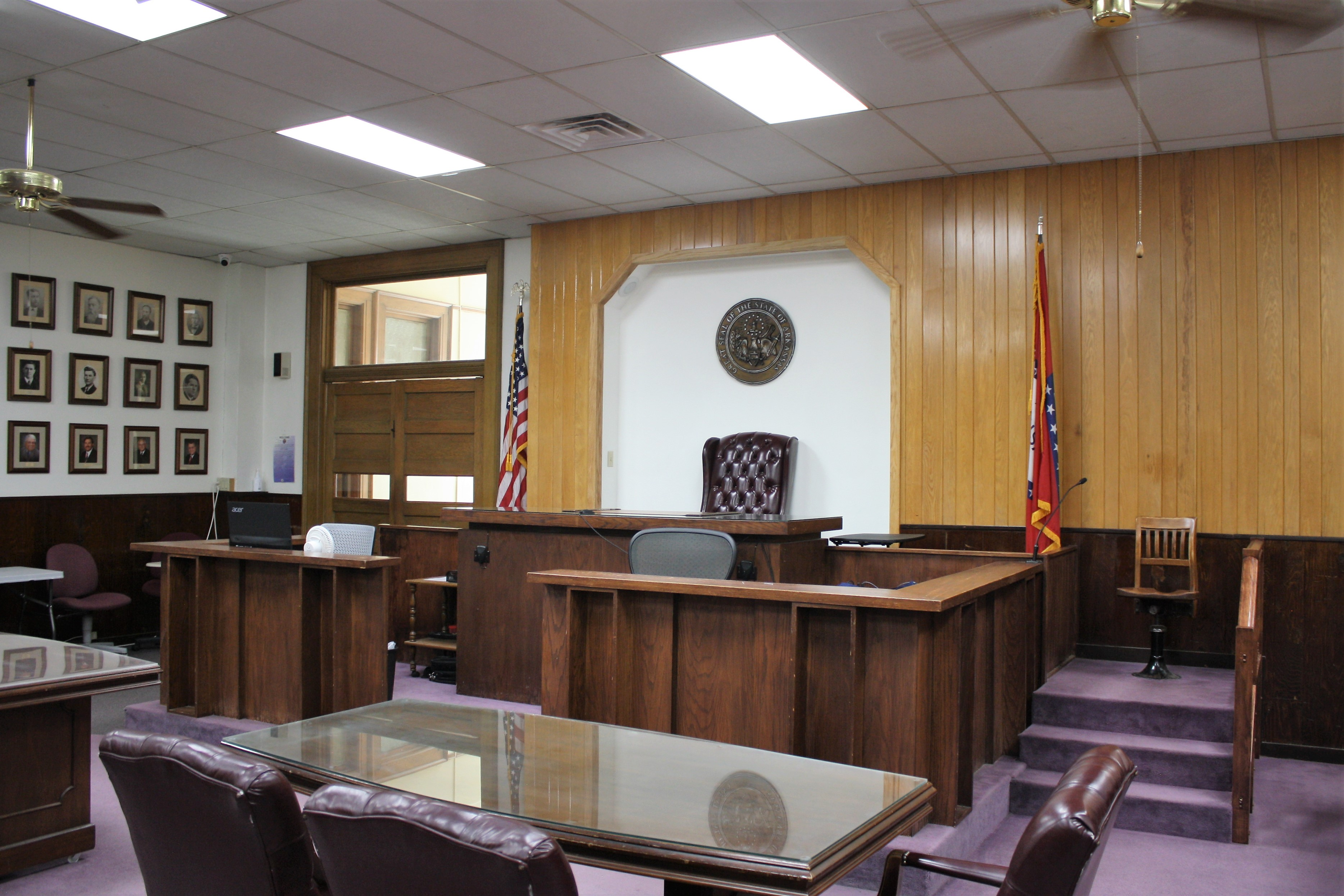
Inside the Boone County Courthouse in Boone County, Arkansas

Criminal law involves the prosecution by the state of wrongful acts which are considered to be so serious that they are a breach of the sovereign's peace (and cannot be deterred or remedied by mere lawsuits between private parties). Generally, crimes can result in incarceration, but torts (see below) cannot. The majority of the crimes committed in the United States are prosecuted and punished at the state level. Federal criminal law focuses on areas specifically relevant to the federal government like evading payment of federal income tax, mail theft, or physical attacks on federal officials, as well as interstate crimes like drug trafficking and wire fraud.

All states have somewhat similar laws in regard to "higher crimes" (or felonies), such as murder and rape, although penalties for these crimes may vary from state to state. Capital punishment is permitted in some states but not others. Three strikes laws in certain states impose harsh penalties on repeat offenders.

Some states distinguish between two levels: felonies and misdemeanors (minor crimes). Generally, most felony convictions result in lengthy prison sentences as well as subsequent probation, large fines, and orders to pay restitution directly to victims; while misdemeanors may lead to a year or less in jail and a substantial fine. To simplify the prosecution of traffic violations and other relatively minor crimes, some states have added a third level, infractions. These may result in fines and sometimes the loss of one's driver's license, but no jail time.

On average, only three percent of criminal cases are resolved by jury trial; 97 percent are terminated either by plea bargaining or dismissal of the charges.

For public welfare offenses where the state is punishing merely risky (as opposed to injurious) behavior, there is significant diversity across the various states. For example, punishments for drunk driving varied greatly prior to 1990. State laws dealing with drug crimes still vary widely, with some states treating possession of small amounts of drugs as a misdemeanor offense or as a medical issue and others categorizing the same offense as a serious felony.

The law of criminal procedure in the United States consists of a massive overlay of federal constitutional case law interwoven with the federal and state statutes that actually provide the foundation for the creation and operation of law enforcement agencies and prison systems as well as the proceedings in criminal trials. Due to the perennial inability of legislatures in the U.S. to enact statutes that would actually force law enforcement officers to respect the constitutional rights of criminal suspects and convicts, the federal judiciary gradually developed the exclusionary rule as a method to enforce such rights. In turn, the exclusionary rule spawned a family of judge-made remedies for the abuse of law enforcement powers, of which the most famous is the Miranda warning. The writ of habeas corpus is often used by suspects and convicts to challenge their detention, while the Third Enforcement Act and Bivens actions are used by suspects to recover tort damages for police brutality.

=== Civil procedure ===
The law of civil procedure governs process in all judicial proceedings involving lawsuits between private parties. Traditional common law pleading was replaced by code pleading in 27 states after New York enacted the Field Code in 1850 and code pleading in turn was subsequently replaced again in most states by modern notice pleading during the 20th century. The old English division between common law and equity courts was abolished in the federal courts by the adoption of the Federal Rules of Civil Procedure in 1938; it has also been independently abolished by legislative acts in nearly all states. The Delaware Court of Chancery is the most prominent of the small number of remaining equity courts.

Thirty-five states have adopted rules of civil procedure modeled after the FRCP (including rule numbers). However, in doing so, they had to make some modifications to account for the fact that state courts have broad general jurisdiction while federal courts have relatively limited jurisdiction.

New York, Illinois, and California are the most significant states that have not adopted the FRCP. Furthermore, all three states continue to maintain most of their civil procedure laws in the form of codified statutes enacted by the state legislature, as opposed to court rules promulgated by the state supreme court, on the ground that the latter are undemocratic. But certain key portions of their civil procedure laws have been modified by their legislatures to bring them closer to federal civil procedure.

Generally, American civil procedure has several notable features, including extensive pretrial discovery, heavy reliance on live testimony obtained at deposition or elicited in front of a jury, and aggressive pretrial "law and motion" practice designed to result in a pretrial disposition (that is, summary judgment) or a settlement. U.S. courts pioneered the concept of the opt-out class action, the "most extreme development of collective civil litigation" in the world, by which the burden falls on class members to notify the court that they do not wish to be bound by the judgment, as opposed to opt-in class actions, where class members must join into the class. Another unique feature is the so-called American Rule under which parties generally bear their own attorneys' fees (as opposed to the English Rule of "loser pays"), though American legislators and courts have carved out numerous exceptions.

=== Contract law ===
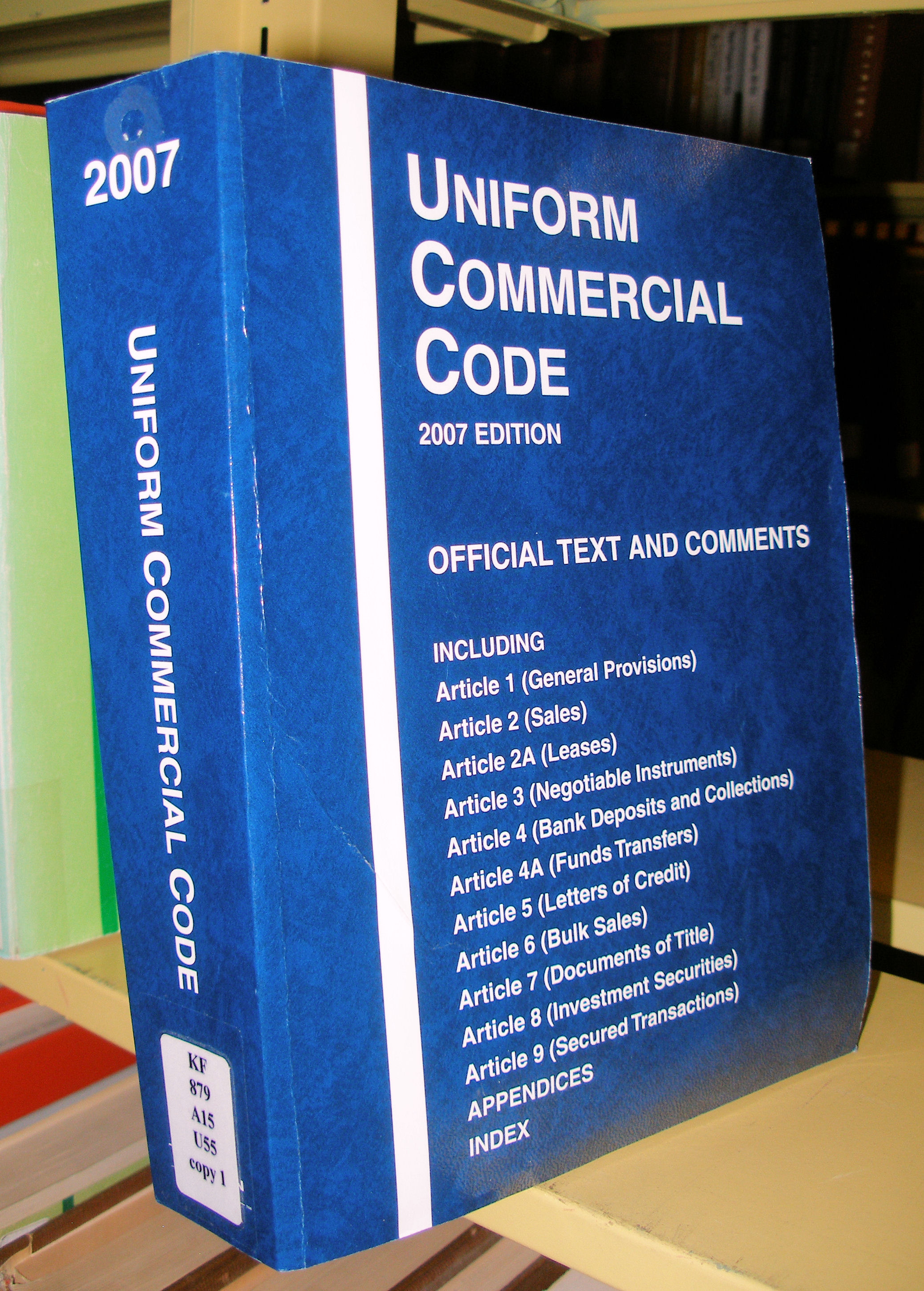
The Uniform Commercial Code

Contract law covers obligations established by agreement (express or implied) between private parties. Generally, contract law in transactions involving the sale of goods has become highly standardized nationwide as a result of the widespread adoption of the Uniform Commercial Code. However, there is still significant diversity in the interpretation of other kinds of contracts, depending upon the extent to which a given state has codified its common law of contracts or adopted portions of the Restatement (Second) of Contracts.

Parties are permitted to agree to arbitrate disputes arising from their contracts. Under the Federal Arbitration Act (which has been interpreted to cover all contracts arising under federal or state law), arbitration clauses are generally enforceable unless the party resisting arbitration can show unconscionability or fraud or something else which undermines the entire contract.

=== Tort law ===
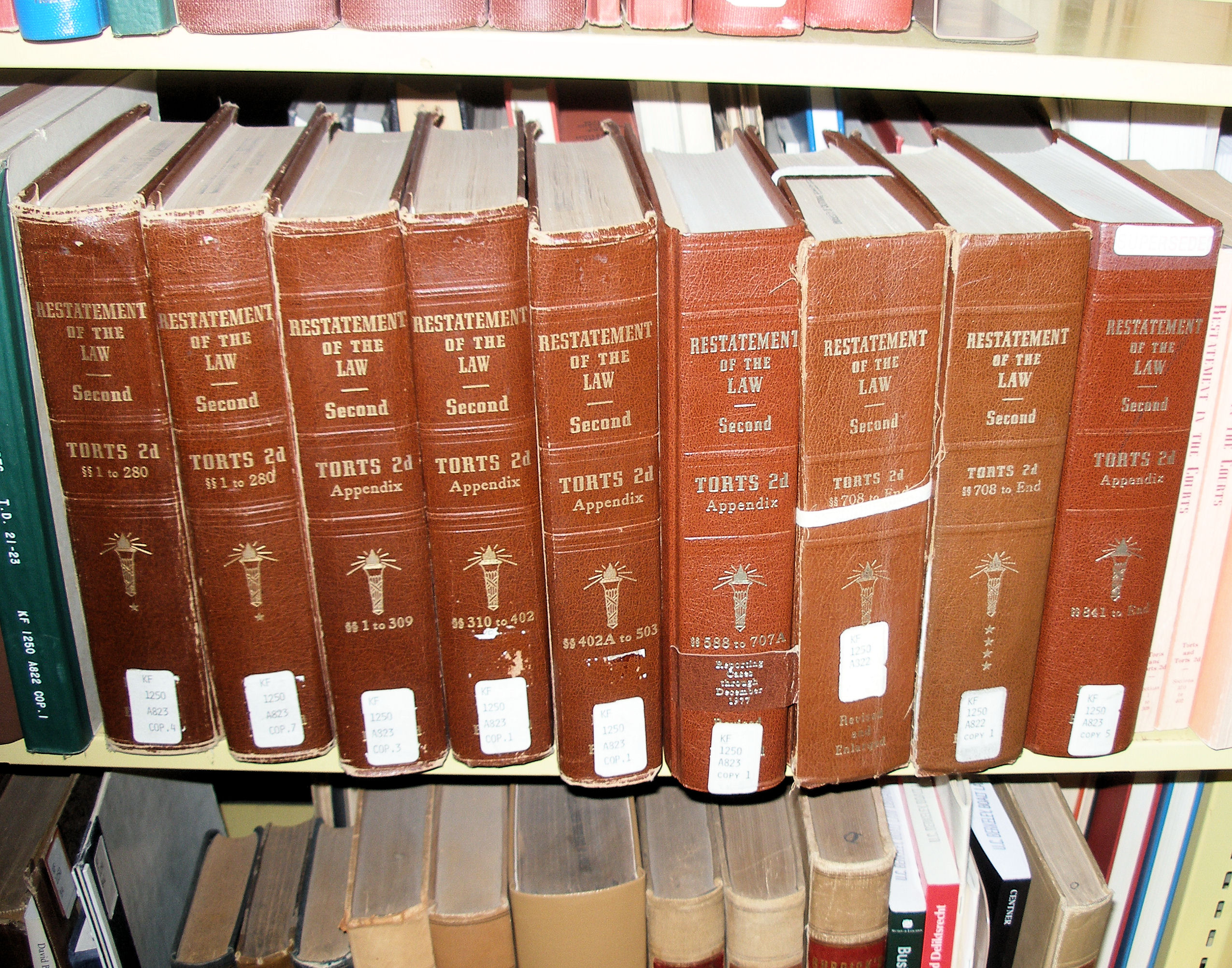
The Restatement (Second) of Torts, a highly influential restatement of United States tort law

Tort law generally covers any civil action between private parties arising from wrongful acts that amount to a breach of general obligations imposed by law and not by contract. This broad family of civil wrongs involves interference "with person, property, reputation, or commercial or social advantage."

Tort law covers the entire imaginable spectrum of wrongs that humans can inflict upon each other, and it partially overlaps with wrongs also punishable by criminal law. It is primarily a matter of state law and is usually developed through case law from state appellate courts; it is rarely a matter of federal law, although some federal statutes, such as the Volunteer Protection Act and the Protection of Lawful Commerce in Arms Act, limit the liability of people who commit torts under state law. State tort-related statutes focus on discrete issues such as authorizing wrongful death claims (which did not exist at common law). Although the American Law Institute has attempted to standardize tort law through the development of several versions of the Restatement of Torts, many states have chosen to adopt only certain sections of the Restatements and to reject others. Thus, because of its immense size and diversity, American tort law cannot be easily summarized.

For example, a few jurisdictions allow actions for negligent infliction of emotional distress even in the absence of physical injury to the plaintiff, but most do not. For any particular tort, states differ on the causes of action, types and scope of remedies, statutes of limitations, and the amount of specificity with which one must plead the cause. With practically any aspect of tort law, there is a "majority rule" adhered to by most states, and one or more "minority rules."

Notably, the most broadly influential innovation of 20th-century American tort law was the rule of strict liability for defective products, which originated with judicial glosses on the law of warranty. In 1963, Roger J. Traynor of the Supreme Court of California threw away legal fictions based on warranties and imposed strict liability for defective products as a matter of public policy in the landmark case of Greenman v. Yuba Power Products. The American Law Institute subsequently adopted a slightly different version of the Greenman rule in Section 402A of the Restatement (Second) of Torts, which was published in 1964 and was very influential throughout the United States. Outside the U.S., the rule was adopted by the European Economic Community in the Product Liability Directive of July 1985, by Australia in July 1992, and by Japan in June 1994.

By the 1990s, the avalanche of American cases resulting from Greenman and Section 402A had become so complicated that another restatement was needed, which occurred with the 1997 publication of the Restatement (Third) of Torts: Products Liability.

=== Property law ===
Historically, American property law has been heavily influenced by English land law, and is therefore concerned with real property first and personal property second. It is also primarily a matter of state law, and the level of interstate diversity in the law of property is much more substantial than in contract and tort. Efforts by both the American Law Institute and the Uniform Law Commission to reduce such interstate diversity were spectacular failures.

The majority of states use a title recording system (coupled with privately provided title insurance) to manage title to real property, although title registration (Torrens title) is also allowed in a small minority of states. Title to personal property is usually not registered, with the notable exceptions of motor vehicles (through a state department of motor vehicles or equivalent), bicycles (in certain cities and counties), and some types of firearms (in certain states).

=== Family law ===
In the United States, family law governs relationships between adults, and relationships between parents and their children. It is a discrete area of law, with lawyers who focus in family law and specialized family law courts. American family law is relatively young in comparison to European family law; it did not take flight until the no-fault divorce revolution of the 1960s. Before the 1950s, widespread religious, legal, and social prohibitions against divorce in the United States meant that divorces were rare, were often seen as fact-driven matters (meaning that they were perceived as turning on each case's unique facts and not broadly generalizable legal principles). The rise of no-fault divorce caused divorce litigation to shift away from the question of who was at fault for the collapse of the marriage, and to focus instead on issues such as division of property, spousal support, and child support.

Family cases are traditionally a matter of state law and are virtually always heard only in state courts. Certain kinds of contract, tort, and property civil actions involving state law issues can be heard in federal courts under diversity jurisdiction, but federal courts decline to hear family cases under the "domestic relations exception" to diversity jurisdiction.

Although family cases are heard in state courts, there has been a trend towards federalization of certain specific issues in family law. State courts and the lawyers who practice before them must be aware of federal income tax and bankruptcy implications of a divorce judgment, federal constitutional rights to abortion and paternity, and federal statutes governing interstate child custody disputes and interstate child support enforcement.

== See also ==
- Admission to the bar in the United States
- Attorneys in the United States
- Black's Law Dictionary
- Courts of the United States
- Legal education in the United States
  - Law school in the United States
- Legal systems of the world
- Privacy laws of the United States

=== Lists ===
- Legal research in the United States
- List of sources of law in the United States
- List of Uniform Acts (United States)—intended for state-level legislation
- List of United States federal legislation
- List of United States Supreme Court cases
