= Law Dictionary =

Law Dictionary may refer to:

Any law dictionary, notably:

- Black's Law Dictionary
- Bouvier's Law Dictionary
