= Law book =

Book regarding law

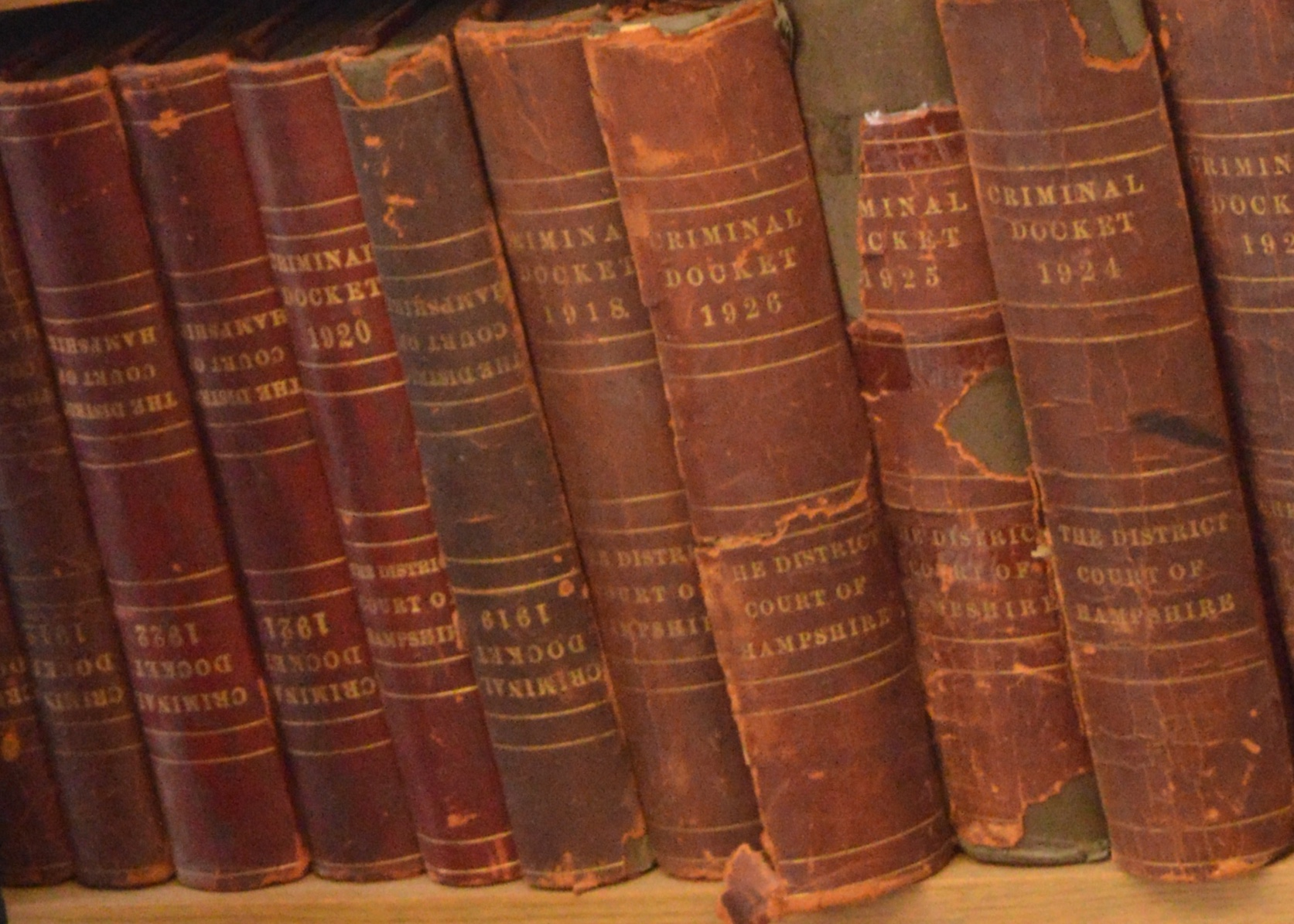
Law books from Hampshire County, Massachusetts.

A law book is a book about law. It is possible to make a distinction between "law books" on the one hand, and "books about law" on the other. This distinction is "useful". A law book is "a work of legal doctrine". It consists of "law talk", that is to say, propositions of law. "The first duty of a law book is to state the law as it is, truly and accurately, and then the reason or principle for it as far as it is known". The "first requisite in a law-book is perfect accuracy". A "law book is supposed to state what the law is rather than what it is not". "One great desideratum in a law book is facility of reference". A "list of law books and related materials" is a legal bibliography.

== See also ==
- Legal treatise
- Law dictionary
