= Law Library Resource Xchange =

Free monthly e-journal

LLRX Law Library Resource Xchange
- Industry: Publishing
- Founded: 1996
- Founder: Sabrina I. Pacifici.
- Products: Internet research guides, technology resource guides and technology updates. Subjects include: Law and Technology, Competitive Intelligence, Cyber-crime, Cybersecurity, Privacy, Civil Liberties, Comparative Law, Foreign Law, International Law, State Legislation and Federal Legislation.
- Website: LLRX.com

Law Library Resource Xchange is a free monthly e-journal, founded in 1996, owned, edited and published by a solo law/business librarian, researcher, and expert knowledge strategist. Content is written by the editor, as well as law librarians, attorneys, academics, law students and other information professionals. LLRX publishes a weekly column on cyber-crime, cybersecurity and privacy , articles on Internet research, technology-related issues, technology-related resources, and technology-related tools. Its archives include Resource Centers on Comparative and Foreign Law, International Law, Search Engines, and State and Federal Legislation, with over 1,400 browsable and searchable sources for state and federal court rules, forms and dockets, and a wide range of resources related to the September 11, 2001 terrorist attacks.

== Recognition ==
- American Library Association Award/Grant, 2009
