= Primary authority =

Statement of law which is binding upon all individuals and institutions

In legal research, a primary authority is a term referring to statements of law that are binding upon the courts, government, and individuals. Primary authority is usually in the form of a document that establishes the law, and if no document exists, is a legal opinion of a court. The search for applicable primary authority is the most important part of the process of legal research.

The term "primary authority" is used to distinguish primary authority materials from texts considered to be secondary authority.

== Examples ==
Examples of primary authority include the verbatim texts of:

- Constitutions;
- Basic laws;
- Statutes (whether codified or uncodified);
- Treaties and certain other international law materials;
- Municipal charters and ordinances;
- Court opinions; (Note: Although the texts of court opinions are primary authority, care should be taken when analyzing the texts to determine which parts are binding as holdings in the case (see Stare decisis, Precedent and Ratio decidendi), and which parts are non-binding (see Obiter dictum).)
- Books of authority;
- Rules of court procedure;
- Rules of evidence;
- Rules governing the conduct of lawyers;
- Administrative regulations;
- Executive orders.

Verbatim re-prints by private commercial law publishing companies are also considered primary authority, as long as the document purports to be and actually is a verbatim re-print of the applicable document, statute, regulation, court opinion, etc. Many lawyers, legal scholars, government agencies and others use verbatim re-prints of texts published by private publishing companies.

== Other uses ==
Primary Authority can also refer to the scheme, created by the British Government, for Local Authority Regulators to provide businesses with tailored advice on regulatory matters. The formal relationship where a business or organisation works together with a Regulator under the scheme is referred to as a Primary Authority Partnership.

== See also ==
- Enabling act
- Secondary authority
- Primary and secondary legislation
