= American Jurisprudence =

Encyclopedia of U.S. law

American Jurisprudence (second edition is cited as Am. Jur. 2d) is an encyclopedia of the United States law, published by West. It was originated by Lawyers Cooperative Publishing, which was subsequently acquired by the Thomson Corporation. The series is now in its second edition, launched in 1962. It is a staple of law libraries, and the current edition is over 140 volumes, updated with replacement volumes, annual pocket supplements, and a New Topic Service binder. The discussion has extensive research references to other Thomson West publications, including sister publications Am. Jur. Trials, Am. Jur. Proof of Facts, Am. Jur. Pleading and Practice Forms, and Am. Jur. Legal Forms. Before Thomson's acquisition of West Publishing, it was a competitor to Corpus Juris Secundum. Am. Jur. is available online through both Westlaw, and LexisNexis.

There is also an American Jurisprudence award in some law schools given to law school students for achieving the highest grade and rank in the class for a particular subject (Contracts, Constitutional Law, etc.).

== See also ==
- List of sources of law in the United States
- Secondary authority
- Corpus Juris Secundum
