= Legal treatise =

Scholarly legal publication

A legal treatise is a scholarly legal publication containing all the law relating to a particular area, such as criminal law or trusts and estates. There is no fixed usage on what books qualify as a "legal treatise", with the term being used broadly to define books written for practicing attorneys and judges, textbooks for law students, and explanatory texts for laypersons. The treatise may generally be loose leaf bound with rings or posts so that updates to laws covered by the treatise and annotated by the editor may be added by the subscriber to the legal treatise.

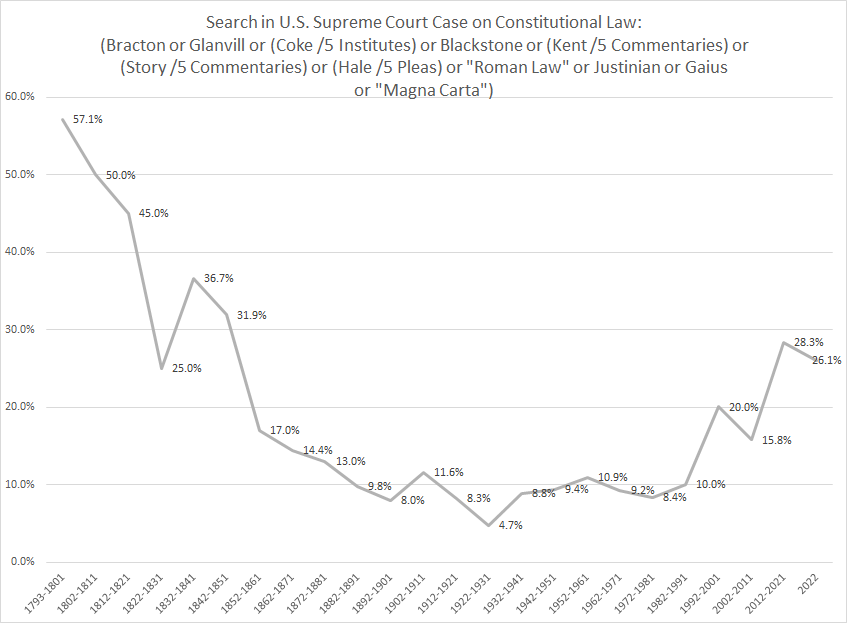
Citation of early treatises over decades since founding of country

Legal treatises are secondary authority, and can serve as a useful starting point for legal research, particularly when the researcher lacks familiarity with a particular area of law. Lawyers commonly use legal treatises in order to review the law and update their knowledge of pertinent primary authority namely, case law, statutes, and administrative regulations. Despite being secondary authority, select treatises are frequently cited in court decisions, including opinions of the Supreme Court of the United States. Indeed, certain early treatises like William Blackstone's Commentaries on the Laws of England and Lord Edward Coke's Institutes of the Lawes of England have shown a marked increase in citation in the last three decades.

In law schools, treatises are sometimes used as additional study materials, as treatises often cover legal subjects at a higher level of detail than most casebooks do. Certain treatises, called hornbooks, are used by American law students as supplements to casebooks. Hornbooks are usually one volume – sometimes a briefer version of a longer, multi-volume treatise written by a recognized legal scholar.

== See also ==
- Treatise on Law, by Thomas Aquinas
- Law book
- Law dictionary
- Treatise
- Law
- Natural law
