= Corpus Juris Secundum =

Encyclopedia of U.S. law

Corpus Juris Secundum (CJS; Latin for 'Second Body of the Law') is an encyclopedia of United States law at the federal and state levels. It is arranged alphabetically, into over 430 topics, which in turn are arranged into subheadings. As of 2010, CJS consisted of 164 bound volumes, five index volumes and 11 table of cases volumes.

CJS is named after the 6th century Corpus Juris Civilis of the Byzantine Emperor Justinian I, the first codification of Roman law and civil law. The name Corpus Juris literally means 'body of the law'; Secundum denotes the second edition of the encyclopedia, which was originally issued as Corpus Juris by the American Law Book Company (from 1914 to 1937). CJS is published by West in print form and on Westlaw. The print edition is updated annually with pocket supplements and revised editions of bound volumes. Before Thomson's acquisition of West, CJS competed against the American Jurisprudence legal encyclopedia.

While legal encyclopedias like CJS were at one time heavily used by the courts, the growth of statutory and regulatory governance has eroded this reliance. As such, rather than being used as sources of authoritative statements of law, legal encyclopedias are now more often used as tools for finding relevant case law.

Volumes 82, 97, and 98 of Corpus Juris Secundum appeared behind the closing credits of the Perry Mason television series. Throughout the series, approximately twenty volumes can be seen on the shelf behind Mason's desk.

== See also ==
- Secondary authority
