= Nef =

Nef or NEF may refer to:

== Businesses and organizations ==
- National Energy Foundation, a British charity
- National Enrichment Facility, an American uranium enrichment plant
- New Economics Foundation, a British think-tank
- Near East Foundation, an American international social and economic development organization
- National Equity Fund, Inc., an American non-profit syndicator of Low Income Housing Tax Credits
- New England Firearms, a brand of H&R Firearms

== People ==
- Adolfo Nef (born 1946), Chilean football goalkeeper
- Alain Nef (born 1982), Swiss footballer
- Francisco Nef (1863–1931), Chilean naval officer and member of the government junta
  - Admiral Nef Naval Hospital
- Hari Nef (born 1992), American actress, model, and writer
- Isabelle Nef (1895–1976), Swiss pianist and harpsichordist
- John Ulric Nef (chemist) (1862–1915), discoverer of the Nef reaction
- John Ulric Nef (economic historian) (1899–1988)
- Karl Nef (1873–1935), Swiss musicologist
- Roland Nef (born 1959), chief of the Swiss Armed Forces in 2008
- Sonja Nef (born 1972), Swiss skier
- Tanguy Nef (born 1996), Swiss skier
- Walter Nef (1919–2013), Swiss mathematician after whom the Nef polygon is named
- Nef the Pharaoh (Tonee Hayes, born 1995), American rapper

== Places ==
- Nef Glacier, Chile
- Nef River, Chile

== Science and technology ==
=== Biology and chemistry ===
- Nef (protein) (Negative Regulatory Factor)
- Nef reaction
- Nef synthesis
- Nef isocyanide reaction
- Nucleotide exchange factor
- S100B, a protein, alias NEF

=== Mathematics ===
- Nef line bundle, in algebraic geometry
- Natural exponential family, in probability and statistics

== Other uses ==
- Nef (ship), French name for a three- or four-masted ocean-going sailing ship
- Nef (metalwork), a table ornament in the shape of a ship
- .nef, or Nikon Electronic Format, a type of raw image format
- Notice of electronic filing, issued by the U.S. court system
- NEF College, in Guwahati, India
- NEF Law College, in Guwahati, India
- Nefamese language, ISO 639-3 language code nef

== See also ==
- Neff, a surname
- Constructa-Neff, a German kitchen appliance manufacturer
- Nave (French: nef)
- Order of the Ship (French: Ordre de la Nef), a secular order of knighthood in the Kingdom of Naples
