= John Ulric Nef =

John Ulric Nef may refer to:

- John Ulric Nef (chemist) (1862–1915), American chemist
- John Ulric Nef (economic historian) (1899–1988), American economic historian
