= Neff =

Neff is a surname of German (also Naf, Naef, Kneff), Swiss (also Naff, Naffe, Nafe), Czech or Ashkenazi Jewish origin.

Notable people with the surname include:

- Adam Neff (born 2001), American tennis player
- Axel Neff, American businessman
- Bob Neff (born 1944), American professional football player
- Calum Neff, Canadian-American long-distance runner
- Charles D. Neff (1922–1991), American Mormon missionary and humanitarian
- Christophe Neff (born 1964), Franco-German geographer
- Christopher Pepin-Neff, American-Australian social scientist and LGBTQ+ rights advocate
- Clarence E. Neff (1909–1988), American politician
- Danverse Neff (1834–1898), American politician
- Dean Neff, American chef and restauranteur
- Donald Neff (1930–2015), American journalist
- Dorothea Neff (1903–1986), Austrian stage and film actress
- Doug Neff (1891–1932), American baseball infielder
- Elizabeth Neff Walker, American romance novel author
- Felix Neff (1798–1829), Swiss Protestant divine and philanthropist
- Francine I. Neff (1925–2010), 35th Treasurer of the United States, 1974–1977
- Garrett Neff (born 1984), American fashion model
- Gina Neff (born 1971), American-born British sociology professor
- Hari Neff (born 1992), American actress, model, and writer as "Hari Nef"
- Heather Neff (born 1957), American writer and university professor
- Henry H. Neff (born 1973), American author and illustrator
- Jacob G. Neff (1840–1935), American politician
- Jacob H. Neff (1830–1909), American politician; lieutenant governor of California, 1899–1903
- Janet T. Neff (born 1945), American judge of the District Court for the Western District of Michigan
- James Neff, American writer and investigative journalist
- Jay H. Neff (1854–1915), American newspaper publisher; mayor of Kansas City, 1904–1905
- Jean-Marie Neff (born 1961), French racewalker
- Jolanda Neff (born 1993), Swiss cyclist
- Kristin Neff, American psychologist
- Leonard Neff (1925–2006), American psychiatrist
- Lucas Neff (born 1985), American actor
- Lyle Neff (born 1969), Canadian poet and journalist
- Magdalena Neff (1881–1966), German pharmacist
- Marcus Neff (1826–1896), American settler in Oregon; respondent in the U.S. Supreme Court case of Pennoyer v. Neff
- Mary Lawson Neff (1862–1945), American neurologist and pioneer women psychiatrist
- Ondřej Neff (born 1945), Czech science fiction writer and journalist
- Pat Morris Neff (1871–1952), American politician from Texas; governor of Texas, 1921–1925
- Paul Neff (born 1938), German wrestler
- Pauline Neff (1885–1951), American stage and film actress
- Prudence Neff (1887–1949), pianist and music teacher based in Chicago
- Robert Neff (born 1995), American artistic gymnast
- Ryan Neff, American bassist for Miss May I
- Steve Neff (born 1948), American 10-pin bowler
- Thomas Neff (1943–2024), American physicist
- Thomas Neff (environmentalist) (born 1955), Austrian environmentalist
- Tom Neff (born 1953), American film executive, director, and producer
- Vladimír Neff (1909–1983), Czech writer and translator
- Wallace Neff (1895–1982), American architect
- Will Neff (born 1989), American Twitch streamer
- Wolfgang Neff (1875–1936), Czech film director

== Disambiguation pages ==
- Jacob Neff (disambiguation)
- John Neff (disambiguation)
