= Harry Goldschmidt =

Swiss musicologist

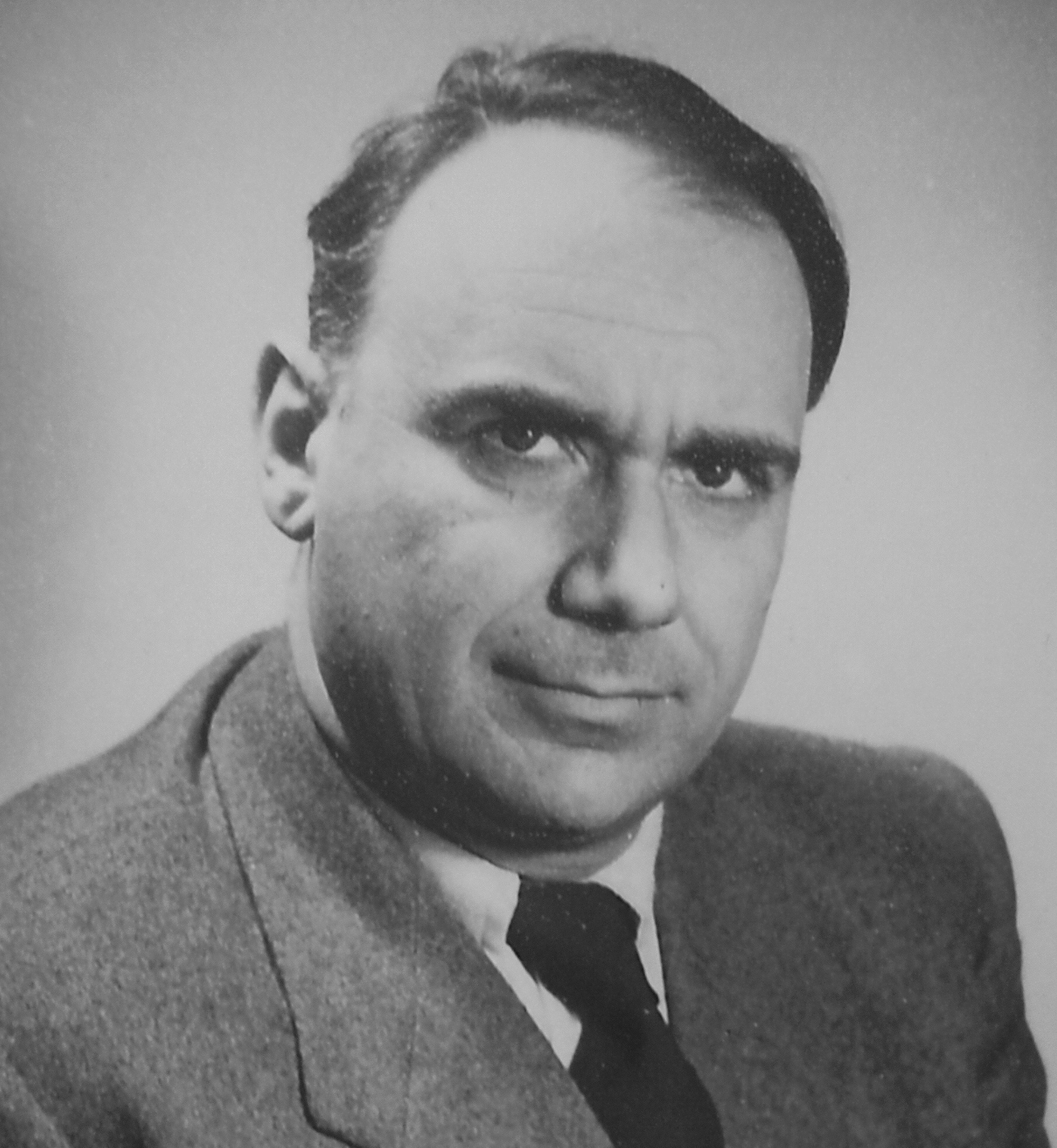
Harry Goldschmidt (1951)

Harry Goldschmidt (17 June 1910 in Basel – 19 November 1986) was a Swiss musicologist.

== Life ==
=== 1910–1949: Basel, Weimar Republic, France, West Africa, Switzerland ===
Goldschmidt was born in Basel on 17 June 1910, the second child of Siegfried Goldschmidt, a banker from Frankfurt, and Vally Goldschmidt-Peiser, a teacher from Breslau. The boy was given the first names of Heinrich Heine: Heinrich (Harry) Leopold. The classically educated parents came from non-practising, fully assimilated German-Jewish families and acquired Swiss citizenship on 8 August 1919 in the city of Basel, where father Siegfried had become the youngest bank director in Switzerland at the Schweizerische Kreditanstalt (now Credit Suisse) in 1905.

After attending the Humanistische Gymnasium in his home town, Goldschmidt began studying musicology (Karl Nef and Jacques Handschin), ethnology at the University of Basel in 1928. (Felix Speiser) and psychology. A doctoral thesis in music ethnology was begun after 1936, but remained unfinished due to active service in the Swiss Armed Forces (1939–1945) during the Second World War. A youth novel Ellen and Ott (Zurich 1937), published under the pseudonym Konrad Illi, was always steadfastly denied by Goldschmidt with a mischievous smile.

At the same time, Goldschmidt trained as a musician (piano, composition, conducting) at the City of Basel Music Academy, which he had attended alongside the school since 1926, and after only one year with Felix Weingartner, who was in Basel at the time, he obtained his conducting diploma. For further training he went to Hermann Scherchen in Königsberg in 1929. (Ostmarken Rundfunk AG Prussia). 1930–31 Goldschmidt completed his music studies at the State Academy of Music in Berlin. Returning to Switzerland, he went to Paris and London in the early 1930s as a writer and music reporter for several Swiss newspapers and as a permanent contributor to various international music journals. In 1933, Goldschmidt became music critic at the Basler National-Zeitung (today Basler Zeitung), which he remained – with interruptions due to the war – until 1948.

Goldschmidt was particularly interested in the music of the "primitive peoples" in the 1930s, partly through the influence of Hermann Scherchen and Felix Speiser. In 1939, he was one of the first to take part in a musical-ethnological expedition to West Africa (especially Senegal), together with mythologists and linguists, and was one of the first to use the new technical means of tape recording. However, the expedition had to be abandoned after four months due to the outbreak of war in September 1939. Nevertheless, Goldschmidt's experiences with the music of non-European peoples continued to shape his life.

After his demobilisation from military service in 1945, Goldschmidt continued to be a music critic for various magazines and newspapers, including the Swiss "Vorwärts", the daily newspaper of the newly founded, left-socialist Partei der Arbeit (a merger of the SP Left with the KPS), whose cultural work he subsequently headed. As part of this work, he founded and directed a mixed choir, the Singgruppe Basel, and played a major role in the organisation of the Volkssinfoniekonzerte. This was a commission from the Basler Gewerkschaftsbund, in which the PdA played a major role at the time. Goldschmidt not only conceived the concerts from a music-historical point of view, but also prepared them in a popular-scientific manner by means of introductory evenings that illustrated the connection between music and society, and they were held at the highest level, according to the motto: "For the working class – the best!" Thus, memorable encounters between simple workers and artists such as Yehudi Menuhin, Clara Haskil, Pablo Casals and others took place.

During this time, that is from 1945 to 1947, Goldschmidt was also secretary of the Basel Study Commission for Radio Questions and from 1947 on secretary of the Swiss Film Archive. Goldschmidt had developed the concept of the Swiss Film Archive together with Georg Schmidt, who had been director of the Kunstmuseum Basel since 1939, and others with an academic interest in new media.

Goldschmidt, who had active contacts with the anti-fascist German emigration in Switzerland during the National Socialist era, received various requests from Germany in the post-war period to participate in the construction of a new, democratic cultural life. As a result of his public appearance for the PdA, of which he had already become a member when it was founded in 1944, he became increasingly broke in the course of the beginning Cold War. He decided to follow the call to Berlin, where he was offered a position at the newly founded Berliner Rundfunk.

=== 1949–1986: Activity in East-Berlin and the DDR ===
In February 1949, Goldschmidt moved to Berlin with his wife, the choreographer Aenne Goldschmidt-Michel. There, living in the soviet sector, he became head of the main music department at the Berliner Rundfunk, which at the time was run as a bizonal British-Soviet project of the occupying powers in the British sector in the Haus des Rundfunks on Masurenallee.

But the idiosyncratic Goldschmidt, who was used to thinking independently and critically and to expressing his opinion openly, soon came into conflict with the Soviet occupying authorities: his musical line was too "cosmopolitan", too "western", too "elitist" and took too little account of "the music of the peoples of the Soviet Union". But these were only pretexts to get rid of Goldschmidt, as were many other non-conformist "Western immigrants" – especially after the so-called field affair, whose Stalinist show trials and "purges" shook the entire Soviet sphere of power. In addition, Noel Field had operated from Switzerland during the war, and Goldschmidt was quite familiar with it.

Thus Goldschmidt lost his job at the Berliner Rundfunk in February 1950 due to Stalinist intrigues. However, important cultural and political forces in the GDR, which was founded on 7 October 1949, were not at all of Soviet opinion: there, the anti-fascist attitude, the profound musicological knowledge, the experience in music education and the Marxist views of Goldschmidt were very much appreciated. Paul Wandel, Minister of National Education of the GDR, appointed him Professor of Music History at the newly founded German Academy of Music (from 1964 Hochschule für Musik "Hanns Eisler" Berlin) as early as August 1950.

Goldschmidt owed this to a large extent to the determined efforts of friends such as Georg Knepler, Hanns Eisler, Erich Weinert, Ernst Hermann Meyer, Paul Dessau among others.

In this way, Goldschmidt succeeded in developing a broad musicological activity in the first half of the fifties despite adverse circumstances: In addition to his appointment as a lecturer, he received commissions for the GDR's 1950 Bach Jubilee Exhibition and the 1952 Beethoven Jubilee Exhibition in Berlin and Leipzig.

Goldschmidt's most important work from this period is his Franz Schubert biography "Schubert – ein Lebensbild", which was published by Henschelverlag Berlin in 1954 and went on to be published in six further editions. This subsequent standard work of Schubert's biography was accepted as a dissertation by the Humboldt University in Berlin and Goldschmidt was awarded a doctorate in philosophy on 29 April 1959.

1950–55 Lecturer in music history at the East Berlin Academy of Music, Goldschmidt went to the People's Republic of China for half a year in 1955–56 on behalf of the GDR Ministry of Culture. In the People's Republic, founded on 1 October 1949, Mao Zedong's motto was: "Let a hundred flowers bloom! Accordingly, people were open-minded about European music and Goldschmidt gave lectures on German and European music history at various Chinese universities.

After his return from China in 1956, Goldschmidt worked as a freelance musicologist with guest lectures at the Humboldt University of Berlin. From 1960 to 1965 he was head of the Central Institute for Music Research in East Berlin.

From the second half of the 1960s onwards, Goldschmidt turned more and more to the music and biography of Ludwig van Beethoven, including fundamental problems such as the relationship between the work of art, biography and contemporary history or the relationship between language, vocal and instrumental music. A whole series of writings were produced (essays, congress papers, Beethoven introductions, Beethoven studies). Goldschmidt organised the 1977 International Beethoven Congress in Berlin on behalf of the GDR government. The government made the newly built plenary hall of the Volkskammer in the Palace of the Republic available for this purpose. The Deputy Minister of Culture Werner Rackwitz gave the opening speech at the lectern of the Volkskammer and Goldschmidt the speech "Artwork and Biography".

The popular-scientific communication of the insights gained was not neglected: Goldschmidt conceived the Beethoven Complete Edition of the VEB Deutsche Schallplatten Berlin and wrote a large number of cover texts for it. The popular work introductions were later compiled into the Reclam anthology (1975). In addition, there were appearances on radio and television in the GDR, as well as popular science lectures for trade unionists and other non-experts.

In addition to a number of extensive books, a large number of publications have been published on Beethoven: see below. Works, Beethoven. Schubert also remained at the centre of his research: s. u. Works, Schubert.

In the years 1976–86 Goldschmidt, as he had been doing since the mid-1960s, was primarily concerned with the problem areas of biography and music aesthetics as well as the relationship between word and instrumental music. He was the organizer and co-editor of the discussion series "Musikästhetik in der Diskussion" (Leipzig 1981) and the International Colloquium Großkochberg 1981 "Komponisten auf Werk und Leben befragt" (Leipzig 1985).

Music Aesthetics: Thoughts on a Non-Aristotelian Music Aesthetics – Lecture at the II International Seminar of Marxist Musicologists (Berlin 1965), Understanding Music as Postulate (Cologne 1974), Cantando-Sonando. Some approaches to a systematic music aesthetics (Berlin 1977/78)

Word and instrumental music: On the unity of the vocal and instrumental sphere in classical music – Presentation at the International Musicological Congress of the Gesellschaft für Musikforschung (Leipzig 1966), Verse and Verse in Beethoven's Instrumental Music – Lecture at the Beethoven Symposium (Vienna 1970), The Word in Instrumental Music: The Ritornelle in Schubert's "Winter Journey" (1986; 1996 posthumously published), The Word in Beethoven's Instrumental Accompaniment (Beethoven Studies III, 1986; 1999 posthumously published)

In 1986, Goldschmidt gave a lecture at the Carl Maria von Weber Congress in Dresden on the subject of "The Wolf Gorge – a Black Mass?" and, as a result of the fiercest controversies, suffered a heart attack during the congress, at which he participated on 19. He died on 19 November 1986; in an obituary in the SED central organ Neues Deutschland the GDR Ministry of Culture honoured him as the nestor of Marxist music research in the GDR.

== Publications ==
=== Books ===
- Franz Schubert – ein Lebensbild, Deutscher Verlag für Musik, 7. Auflage, Leipzig 1980
- Um die Sache der Musik, Reclam-Verlag, 2. erweiterte Auflage, Leipzig 1976
- Beethoven – Werkeinführungen, Reclam-Verlag, Leipzig 1975
- Die Erscheinung Beethoven (Beethoven-Studien I), Deutscher Verlag für Musik, Leipzig 1985
- Immortal Beloved. Eine Bestandsaufnahme (Beethoven-Studien II), Deutscher Verlag für Musik, Leipzig 1977; erweiterte Ausgabe Um die Unsterbliche Geliebte. Ein Beethoven-Buch, Rogner & Bernhard, München/Berlin 1980; in Englisch: All About Beethoven's Immortal Beloved. A Stocktaking, Übers. John E Klapproth, Charleston, SC: CreateSpace 2014.
- Das Wort in instrumentaler Musik: Die Ritornelle in Schuberts « Winterreise » (1986), edited by Hanns-Werner Heister, von Bockel Verlag, Hamburg 1996
- Das Wort in Beethovens Instrumentalbegleitung (Beethoven-Studien III), 1986 – edited by Hanns-Werner Heister, Böhlau Verlag, Cologne 1999

=== Books under pseudonym ===
- Konrad Illi: Ellen und Ott, Humanitas Verlag, Zürich 1937
- Titus Oliva: Es muß sein. Ein Lesebuch zu einem imaginären Beethoven-Film, Deutscher Verlag für Musik, Leipzig 1982

=== About different composers ===
- Johann Sebastian Bach in seiner Zeit, Bach-Ausstellung, Leipzig/Berlin 1950/51
- Das Vermächtnis von Johannes Brahms. Zu seinem 120. Geburtstag, in Musik und Gesellschaft 1953/3
- Edvard Grieg – Einige Betrachtungen zu seinem 50. Todestag, in Musik und Gesellschaft 1957/9
- Gedanken über Hanns Eisler. Zum 60. Geburtstag, in Musik und Gesellschaft 1958/6
- Janáček und Strawinsky. Diskussionsbeitrag auf dem Janáček-Kongress Brno, Oktober 1958, in Musik und Gesellschaft 1958/6
- Georges Bizet, in Aus dem Leben und Schaffen großer Musiker, Berlin 1961
- Claude Debussy, Gedenkansprache in der Deutschen Staatsoper Berlin, Berlin 1962
- Ernst Hermann Meyer: Die konzertante Sinfonie für Klavier und Orchester 1961, Eterna Schallplatten-Einführung, Berlin 1963
- Hermann Scherchen – Zum Tode des Musikers, in Musik und Gesellschaft 1966/8
- Claudio Monteverdi, Gedenkansprache in der Deutschen Staatsoper Berlin, Berlin 1967
- Mozart: Die Cavatina des Figaro – eine semantische Analyse, in Beiträge zur Musikwissenschaft 1973/3
- Das Violinkonzert von Ernst Hermann Meyer, in Festschrift für Ernst Hermann Meyer zum 60. Geburtstag, Leipzig 1973
- Johannes-Passion: «Es ist vollbracht» – zu Bachs obligatem Begleitverfahren, in Bericht über die musikwissenschaftliche Konferenz zum III. Internationalen Bach-Fest der DDR 1975, Leipzig 1977
- «Den Gesang fortsetzend» – Eine Mahler-Studie (1979/80), in Studien zur Musikwissenschaft, Berlin 1984
- Das prosodisch-rhetorische Regulativ bei J. S. Bach, in Beiträge zur Musikwissenschaft 1985/1

=== Musik und Gesellschaft: Music history, music aesthetics, popular science ===
- Die Aufgaben der Musikwissenschaft, Diskussionsbeitrag auf der Gründungskonferenz des Verbandes deutscher Komponisten und Musikwissenschaftler 1951, in Musik und Gesellschaft 1951/3
- Über die musikalische Gestalt. Referat auf dem II. Kongress des Verbandes deutscher Komponisten und Musikwissenschaftler, Leipzig 1954
- Musikgeschichte im Überblick. Teil I – Von der Urgesellschaft zur Renaissance, gemeinsam mit Georg Knepler und Ernst H. Meyer, Studienmaterial für die künstlerischen Lehranstalten, 4/1956 issue
- Vierzehn Vorlesungen über deutsche Musikgeschichte (Veröffentlichung in chinesischer Sprache, als Ergebnis der Lehrtätigkeit in der Volksrepublik China 1955/56), 1957
- Konzertbuch – Orchestermusik. Erster Teil 17. bis 19. Jahrhundert, edited by K. Schönewolf, darin: Einleitung zur Periode 1789–1830, Sinfonische Musik der Französischen Revolution, Franz Schubert. Berlin 1958
- Musik und Fortschritt – Zur Problematik des musikalischen Avantgardismus, in Periodikum für Wissenschaftlichen Sozialismus 1959, X
- Zur Methodologie der musikalischen Analyse, Vortrag auf der Jahrestagung der Gesellschaft für Musikforschung 1961, in Beiträge zur Musikwissenschaft 1961/4
- Verantwortung und Perspektive. Aus dem Schlusswort der populärwissenschaftlichen Tagung «Wort und Schrift im Dienste des Musikverständnisses» 1961, in Musik und Gesellschaft 1962/1
- Musikalische Gestalt und Intonation, Referat auf dem 1. Internationalen Seminar marxistischer Musikwissenschaftler, Prag 1963, in Beiträge zur Musikwissenschaft 1963/4
- Es ging um die Heitere Muse – die Poesie des Alltags, Diskussionsbeitrag auf der Berliner Konferenz zu Fragen der Tanz- und Unterhaltungsmusik, in Musik und Gesellschaft 1964/3
- Zu einigen Fragen der Populärwissenschaft in der Musik, in Musik und Gesellschaft 1964/6
- Interpret und Wissenschaft, Referat auf dem I. Musikkongress, Berlin 1964, in Musik und Gesellschaft 1964/11
- Gedanken zu einer nicht-aristotelischen Musikästhetik – Referat auf dem II. Internationalen Seminar marxistischer Musikwissenschaftler, Berlin 1965, in Beiträge zur Musikwissenschaft 1965/4
- Über die Einheit der vokalen und instrumentalen Sphäre in der klassischen Musik – Referat auf dem Internationalen musikwissenschaftlichen Kongress der Gesellschaft für Musikforschung, Leipzig 1966, in Deutsches Jahrbuch für Musikwissenschaft für 1966
- Musikverstehen als Postulat, in Sammelband Musik und Verstehen, Cologne 1974
- Cantando–Sonando. Einige Ansätze zu einer systematischen Musikästhetik, Berlin 1977/78, in Musikästhetik in der Diskussion, Leipzig 1981

=== About Schubert ===
- Notwendige Bemerkungen zu einem Schubert-Film, in Musik und Gesellschaft 1954/3
- Die Frage der Periodisierung im Schaffen Schuberts, Vorlesung an der Universität Paris 1958, in Beiträge zur Musikwissenschaft 1959/2
- Zu einer Neubewertung von Schuberts letzter Schaffenszeit (1828), Referat auf dem 7. Internationalen Kongress der Gesellschaft für Musikforschung, Kongressbericht Cologne 1958
- Schuberts Winterreise, Einführungsheft zur Eterna-Schallplattenkassette, Berlin 1962
- Welches war die ursprüngliche Reihenfolge in Schuberts Heine-Liedern?, in Deutsches Jahrbuch der Musikwissenschaft für 1972, Leipzig 1974
- Eine weitere E-Dur-Sinfonie? Zur Kontroverse um die Gmunden-Gastein-Sinfonie, Referat auf dem Schubert-Kongress in Wien 1978, in Kongressbericht Vienna1979
- Franz Schubert zum 150. Todestag. Gedenkrede in der Deutschen Staatsoper Berlin, 1978
- Unser Schubertverständnis heute, Grundreferat auf der Schubert-Konferenz des Kulturbundes der DDR 1979, in Musik und Gesellschaft 1978/11
- Der erste Satz der großen C-Dur-Sinfonie – eine prosodische Studie, in Beiträge zur Musikwissenschaft 1980/1
- Franz Schubert: « Die Allmacht », Erstveröffentlichung für gemischten Chor und Klavier, Leipzig 1983
- Eine gefälschte Schubert-Sinfonie?, in Musica 1984, Beilage zu Heft 4
- Das Wort in instrumentaler Musik: Die Ritornelle in Schuberts « Winterreise » (1986), edited by Hanns-Werner Heister, Hamburg 1996

=== About Beethoven ===
- "Wenn sich Geist und Kraft vereinen". Beethovens "Chorfantasie" im Deutschen Nationalprogramm, in: Musik und Gesellschaft, Jg. 1 (1951), S. 166–173
- Ludwig van Beethoven und seine Zeit, illustrierter Führer durch die deutsche Beethovenausstellung, Berlin 1952
- Beethovens "Achte", ein gesellschaftskritisches Werk? Zu dem Diskussionsbeitrag von H. H. Schmitz, Heft 9/1951, in Musik und Gesellschaft, Jg. 2 (1952), S. 10–12
- Zwei Skizzenblätter, ein Beitrag zur Programmatik Beethovens, in Musik und Gesellschaft, Jg. 3 (1953), S. 15–18
- Ein unterschlagenes Beethoven-Zitat, in Musik und Gesellschaft, Jg. 3 (1953), S. 18–19 (über einen Ausspruch Beethovens gegen den Kaiser, der in der deutschen Ausgabe von Thayers Beethovenbiographie nicht wiedergegeben wurde)
- Motivvariation und Gestaltmetamorphose. Zur musikalischen Entstehungsgeschichte von Beethovens Violinkonzert, in Festschrift Heinrich Besseler zum sechzigsten Geburtstag, hrsg. vom Institut für Musikwissenschaft der Karl-Marx-Universität, Leipzig 1961, S. 389–409
- Das ominöse Opus 91, in Harry Goldschmidt, Um die Sache der Musik, Leipzig 1970, S. 20–27
- Zitat oder Parodie?, in Beiträge zur Musikwissenschaft, Jg. 12 (1970), S. 171–198
- Vers und Strophe in Beethovens Instrumentalmusik, in Beethoven-Symposion Wien 1970. Bericht, Wien, Köln, Graz 1971, S. 97–120
- Der späte Beethoven. Versuch einer Standortbestimmung, in: Bericht über den internationalen Beethoven-Kongreß 10.–12. Dezember 1970 in Berlin, Berlin 1971, S. 41–58 – auch in: Musik und Gesellschaft, Jg. 21 (1971), S. 96–102
- Beethovens Anweisungen zum Spiel der Cramer-Etüden, in Bericht über den internationalen Beethoven-Kongreß 10–12. December 1970 in Berlin, Berlin 1971, S. 545–558
- Die Erscheinung Beethoven (Beethoven-Studien I), Leipzig 1974
- Un lieto brindisi – cantata campestre, in Beethoven-Jahrbuch, Jg. 8, Bonn 1975, S. 157–205
- Beethoven. Werkeinführungen, Leipzig 1975
- with Clemens Brenneis, Aspekte gegenwärtiger Beethoven-Forschung, in Beiträge zur Musikwissenschaft, Jg. 18 (1976), issue 1, S. 3–38 und Sonderheft zu Beethoven Aufsätze und Annotationen, 1979
- Beethovens Leonore, L.v.Beethoven-Gesamtausgabe, Eterna-Katalog, Berlin 1977
- Beethoven in neuen Brunsvik-Briefen, in Beethoven-Jahrbuch, Jg. 9, Bonn 1977, S. 97–146
- Kunstwerk und Biographie, Referat auf dem Internationalen Beethoven-Kongress, Berlin 1977, in Musik und Gesellschaft 1977/3
- Das Wort in Beethovens Instrumentalbegleitung (Beethoven-Studien III), 1986 – edited by Hanns-Werner Heister, Böhlau Verlag, Cologne 1999
