= Marshall Hodgson =

American historian (1922–1968)

Marshall G.S. Hodgson
- Born: April 11, 1922; Richmond, Indiana, United States
- Died: June 10, 1968 (aged 46); Chicago, Illinois, United States
- Known for: Coining the term "Islamicate", contributions to Islamic and world history studies
- Title: American historian
- Children: 3
- Awards: Ralph Waldo Emerson Award (posthumous)

Academic background
- Education: University of Chicago (PhD)
- Academic advisors: Gustave E. von Grunebaum, Muhsin Mahdi, William H. McNeill, John Ulric Nef

Academic work
- Discipline: Islamic studies, world history
- Institutions: University of Chicago
- Notable works: The Venture of Islam: Conscience and History in a World Civilization

Marshall Goodwin Simms Hodgson (April 11, 1922 – June 10, 1968) was an American historian and scholar of Islamic studies, best known for his pioneering work on Islamic civilization and his broader contributions to world history. He taught at the University of Chicago, where he developed an influential yearlong course on Islamic civilizations and later chaired the interdisciplinary Committee on Social Thought.

Hodgson's scholarship, particularly through his posthumously published three-volume work The Venture of Islam: Conscience and History in a World Civilization, introduced new interpretive frameworks to understand Islam's global and cultural complexity. He critiqued Eurocentrism and coined the term "Islamicate" to distinguish cultural phenomena associated with Muslim societies from those that are strictly religious.

== Biography ==
=== Early life and education ===
Born in Richmond, Indiana, Hodgson was raised in a practicing Quaker family and maintained a vegetarian lifestyle consistent with Quaker principles. During World War II, he served as a conscientious objector in the Civilian Public Service from 1943 to 1946. He earned his Ph.D. in 1951 at the University of Chicago, where he would spend the remainder of his career.

=== Academic career ===
After joining the University of Chicago faculty, Hodgson became a tenured professor in 1961. In 1964, he assumed leadership of both the Committee on Social Thought and the newly created Committee on Near Eastern Studies. His 1957 course on Islamic civilizations broke from prevailing Orientalist models, incorporating Persianate, Turkic, and other non-Arab contributions to the development of Islamic societies.

He collaborated with notable scholars including Gustave E. von Grunebaum, Muhsin Mahdi, William H. McNeill, and John Ulric Nef. Hodgson was married with three daughters and died suddenly in 1968 while jogging on campus.

== Major works and ideas ==
=== The Venture of Islam ===
Hodgson published relatively little during his lifetime, but his most significant contribution came posthumously: The Venture of Islam, edited and prepared for publication by colleagues, notably Reuben Smith. The three-volume work sought to situate Islam within a global historical narrative and introduced the now-discussed term "Islamicate."

Hodgson used "Islamicate" to describe elements of culture historically associated with Muslim societies but not necessarily religious in nature. For example, wine poetry was categorized as "Islamicate" because it flourished within an Islamic cultural sphere, even if it conflicted with Islamic moral norms.

While some praised this distinction for its clarity, others criticized it as overcomplicating or marginally adopted. The Grove Encyclopedia of Islamic Art and Architecture, for example, noted that although imperfect, the term "Islamic" remains more widely accepted.

=== Rethinking World History ===
In essays compiled posthumously under the title Rethinking World History: Essays on Europe, Islam, and World History (1993), edited by Edmund Burke III, Hodgson expanded his critique of Eurocentric historiography. He proposed that the industrial rise of Europe was part of broader Eurasian dynamics, not a uniquely Western phenomenon. For instance, he argued that technological and institutional innovations from Sung China laid groundwork that was later inherited by the West:

"Some of the crucial inventions...came ultimately from China... In such ways, the Occident seems to have been the unconscious heir of the abortive industrial revolution of Sung China."

=== Intellectual influences ===
Two figures shaped Hodgson's intellectual direction. The first was Louis Massignon, a French Catholic priest and Islamicist, who inspired in him an empathetic view of Islamic spirituality. The second was John Woolman, an 18th-century Quaker whose ethical views and critique of materialism paralleled Hodgson's own commitments.

== Legacy ==
=== Impact on Islamic and world history ===
The Venture of Islam remains a foundational text in Islamic studies and continues to influence teaching and scholarship. Its scope and depth offer a counterweight to narratives that center exclusively on the Western experience. The New York Times described Hodgson's work as reshaping the discourse on Islam by embedding it within the larger history of global civilization.

=== Debates on "Islamicate" and related terms ===
Hodgson's neologisms such as "Islamicate" and "Islamdom" sparked significant scholarly discussion. Bruce B. Lawrence called Hodgson's vision a "moral history of the world," highlighting how these concepts sought to decenter Eurocentric paradigms and acknowledge Islamic civilization's formative role in shaping the modern world.

=== Criticisms ===
Not all scholars agreed with Hodgson's frameworks. Richard Maxwell Eaton critiqued his "core and periphery" model for reinforcing geographic hierarchies, arguing that it may inadvertently counter Hodgson's own pluralistic intentions. Others, like Edward Said, questioned whether any Western framework, however empathetic, could fully escape Orientalist assumptions. Said's remarks reflect an ongoing debate about positionality and authority in Islamic studies.

Mukerrem Miftah Shafi further argued that terms such as "Islamdom" may impose artificial boundaries that overlook the fluidity and heterogeneity of Muslim societies.

=== Pedagogical influence ===
Despite the acclaim, Hodgson's prose style has been described as challenging for undergraduate readers. Lawrence notes that the complexity of his language and conceptual innovations require guidance but remain essential for moving beyond binary constructions of "Islam" and "the West."

=== Recognition ===
Hodgson received the Ralph Waldo Emerson Award posthumously from the Phi Beta Kappa Society. His papers—including teaching materials, personal notes, and correspondence—are housed at the University of Chicago Library's Hanna Holborn Gray Special Collections Research Center.

== See also ==
- World history
- Islamic studies

== Bibliography ==
- Hodgson, Marshall G. S. (1955). The Secret Order of Assassins: The Struggle of the Early Nizârî Ismâʻîlîs against the Islamic World. 's-Gravenhage: Mouton.
- Hodgson, Marshall G. S. (1974). The Venture of Islam: Conscience and History in a World Civilization. Vol. 1–3. Chicago: The University of Chicago Press.
- Hodgson, Marshall G. S. (1993). Rethinking World History: Essays on Europe, Islam and World History. Cambridge: Cambridge University Press.
