= Committee on Social Thought =

Doctorate-granting committee at the University of Chicago

The John U. Nef Committee on Social Thought is a PhD-granting committee at the Social Sciences Division at the University of Chicago. It was started in 1941 by economic historian John Ulric Nef along with economist Frank Knight, anthropologist Robert Redfield, and University President Robert Maynard Hutchins.

== The Committee ==
The committee is interdisciplinary and it is not centered on any specific topic; rather, the committee has, since its inception, drawn together noted academics and writers to "foster awareness of the permanent questions at the origin of all learned inquiry".

Chairs

- Robert B. Pippin

== Noted members ==
Notable past members of and students on the committee have included

- writers Saul Bellow, J. M. Coetzee, T. S. Eliot, and Adam Zagajewski
- political theorists Hannah Arendt, Allan Bloom, and Mark Lilla,
- classicist David Grene,
- historians Marc Fumaroli, Marshall G. S. Hodgson, David Nirenberg, and Paul Wheatley,
- sociologist Edward Shils,
- sinologist Anthony C. Yu,
- anthropologist Victor Turner,
- poet and philologist A. K. Ramanujan,
- poet Tom Mandel,
- philosophers Vincent Descombes, Mircea Eliade, Leszek Kołakowski, Jacques Maritain, Yves Simon, Paul Ricoeur, Stephen Toulmin, and Jean-Luc Marion.
- economists Robert Fogel and Friedrich Hayek.

Eliot, Bellow, Coetzee, Hayek, and Fogel have been awarded Nobel Prizes.

== Current faculty ==
Current faculty include religion scholar Wendy Doniger, sociologist Hans Joas, literary theorist Thomas Pavel, theorist of German literature David Wellbery, classicist James M. Redfield, philosopher and psychoanalyst Jonathan Lear, philosopher Robert B. Pippin, classicist Laura M. Slatkin, historian of science Lorraine Daston, physician and philosopher Leon Kass (former chairman of the President's Council on Bioethics), political theorist Nathan Tarcov, art historian Andrei Pop, poet Rosanna Warren, philosopher Gabriel Richardson Lear, historian Joel Isaac, historian Jonathan Levy, classicist Mark Payne, and political theorist Jennifer Pitts.

== See also ==
- Social theory
