= Nef synthesis =

Process in organic chemistry

Named after	John Ulric Nef
Reaction type	Coupling reaction

Identifiers
RSC ontology ID	RXNO:0000506

In organic chemistry, Nef synthesis is the addition of sodium acetylides to aldehydes and ketones to yield propargyl alcohols. It is named for John Ulric Nef, who discovered the reaction in 1899.

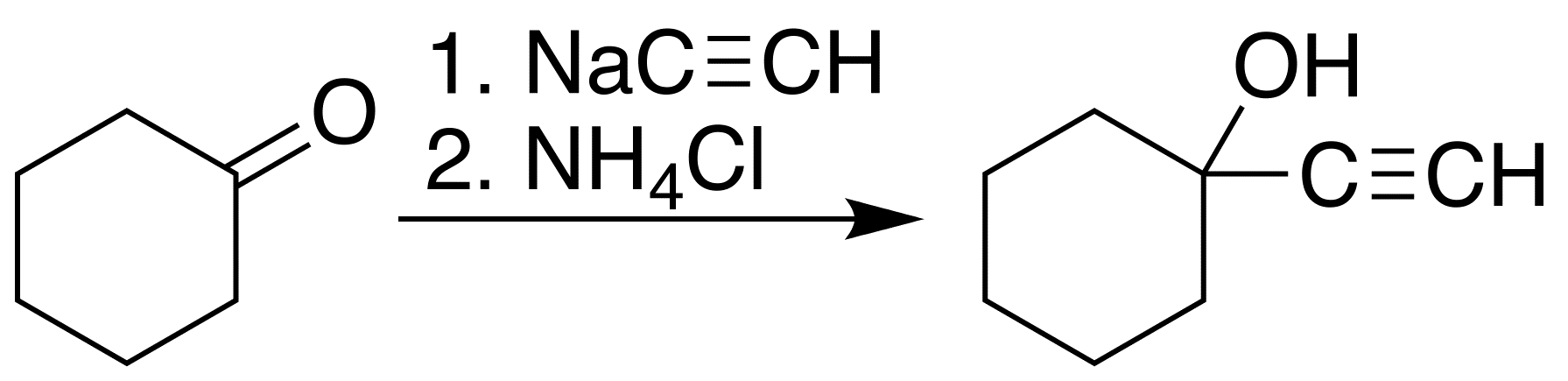

This process is often erroneously referred to as the Nef reaction, which is an unrelated chemical transformation discovered by the same chemist.

== See also ==
- Favorskii reaction
- Alkynation
