= Aenne Goldschmidt =

Swiss woman dancer (1920–2020)

- Born: Aenne Michel; November 8, 1920; Bern, Switzerland
- Died: January 24, 2020 (aged 99); Riehen, Switzerland
- Occupations: Expressionist dancer, choreographer, pedagogue

Aenne Goldschmidt (née Michel; 8 November 1920 – 24 January 2020) was a Swiss expressionist dancer, choreographer, and pedagogue. She was the first dance artist to receive the National Prize of the German Democratic Republic.

== Biography ==
Aenne Michel was born on 8 November 1920 in Bern, Switzerland. She trained at Emmy Sauerbeck's dance school in Bern and worked as a freelance dance artist. In the 1930s and 1940s she was active in Communist circles, even after the Communist Party was banned by the Swiss government. In 1944 she and her husband, musicologist Harry Goldschmidt, were among the founding members of the Swiss Party of Labour. Due to their communist views they left Switzerland and moved to East Germany in 1949. Later that year she choreographed a piece for the World Festival of Youth and Students in Budapest. In 1952 she was awarded the National Prize of the German Democratic Republic for her work at the 1951 World Festival in East Berlin, becoming the first dancer to receive the national award from the East German government. From 1951 to 1959 Goldschmidt served as director of the East German State Folk Art Ensemble's dance company. Between 1967 and 1970 she published a three volume manual of German folk dance. In 1994, after the fall of the Communist government in East Germany and the German reunification, Goldschmidt and her husband returned to Switzerland and settled in Riehen.

She died in January 2020 at the age of 99.
