= Local Initiatives Support Corporation =

US non-profit organization

- Formation: 1979
- Founder: Ford Foundation
- Type: Non-Profit CDFI
- Location: Headquartered in New York City, Local Offices in 30+ Cities in the US
- Region served: United States
- Method: Grants, Loans, Investments
- Key people: Robert Rubin: Chairman of the Board
- Revenue: $136,957,578 (2015)
- Expenses: $121,483,767 (2015)
- Website: www.lisc.org

The Local Initiatives Support Corporation (LISC) is a US non-profit community development financial institution (CDFI) that supports community development initiatives across the country. It has offices in nearly 40 cities and works across 2,100 rural counties in 44 states. LISC was created in 1979 by executives from the Ford Foundation. LISC's affiliates include the National Equity Fund (NEF), the largest national syndicator of Low Income Housing Tax Credits (LIHTC), the New Markets Support Company, a national syndicator of New Markets Tax Credits, and immito, which specializes in SBA 7a lending.

LISC and its affiliates support community development projects through grants, loans and equity investments as well as technical and management assistance. In the 2020 fiscal year, it reported grants, loans and investments totaling US$2 billion, leveraging $4.4 billion in total development and supporting over 700 partners across America. Since 1979, LISC has invested $24 billion into communities, leveraging $69 billion to support the creation of 436,000 affordable homes and apartments and 74.4 million square feet of retail and community facilities.

== History ==
Previous logo

The idea for LISC was conceived in 1979 by a group of Ford Foundation officials, including foundation president Franklin A, Thomas, and trustees visiting community development projects in Baltimore. One of the trustees asked Ford Foundation Vice President Mitchell Sviridoff "what he would do if he had $25 million to spend on helping declining cities." Sviridoff responded that he would "identify competent leaders in 50 to 100 communities around the nation and give them as much money and support as possible." Sviridoff went on to become LISC's first president. Robert D. Lilley, a former president of AT&T, was chosen to be the first chair of LISC’s board.

LISC was founded in December 1979 and formally announced in May 1980, with $10 million in capital from the Ford Foundation, Aetna, Continental Illinois Bank, International Harvester, Levi Strauss & Co., and Prudential Insurance. LISC made its first loans and grants to 27 community organizations in December 1980. The initial grantees were a diverse group, including housing developers in New York City, child-care facilities in California and economic development organizations in rural Appalachia. By 1985, LISC had raised $100 million and was active in 20 cities.

The South Bronx quickly became a focus for the new organizations work. In addition to banks and foundations, LISC began raising capital from private corporations like Macy’s, CBS, Metlife, and Time, Inc. LISC’s investments in the Bronx helped stabilize the borough after the "Bronx is burning" era of the 1970s. The investments resulted in the first private homes built in the Bronx in decades. LISC’s work in the South Bronx received wide acclaim from the media, local residents and government officials. The success of early efforts in the South Bronx became the model for community development throughout the country. In 1997 President Bill Clinton toured Charlotte Street in the Bronx, one of the first LISC projects, and noted "Look at where the Bronx was when President Jimmy Carter came here in despair. Look at where the Bronx was when President Reagan came here and compared it to London in the Blitz. Look at the Bronx today. If you can do it, everybody else can do it."

=== 1980s: Low Income Housing Tax Credit ===
LISC was an early advocate for the Low-Income Housing Tax Credit (LIHTC), which created by the Reagan Administration in the Tax Reform Act of 1986. In 1987, LISC launched the National Equity Fund (NEF) to syndicate LIHTC, raising $14.5 million in the first year. In 1988 LISC raised $51 Million for affordable housing project through LIHTC, and $77 Million in 1990. Although LIHTC was initially created as a temporary measure set to expire by 1989, its effectiveness prompted LISC and other organizations to advocate for its extension. In 1993, Congress granted LIHTC permanent status. Once LIHTC achieved permanency, LISC and NEF launched a program to build 1.5 billion dollars' worth of affordable housing.

=== 1990s: Rural Program, Partnerships, Robert Rubin ===
In 1995 LISC launched Rural LISC, expanding beyond urban areas in an effort to spur rural economic and housing development. In its first year, Rural LISC supported 68 rural development organizations. Today, it partners with hundreds of organizations in over one thousand rural counties.

In 1997 LISC partnered with the NFL to create and refurbish playing fields in low-income urban areas. In 1999, Clinton's Treasury Secretary Robert Rubin became the Chairman of the Board of LISC. In 2002, with support from the Walton Family Foundation, LISC began financing charter schools.

=== 2000s: Building Sustainable Communities ===
In 2007, under the leadership of CEO Michael Rubinger, LISC created a comprehensive community development strategy called Building Sustainable Communities (BSC), which featured five place-based goals.

==== Expanding investment in housing and other real estate ====
Affordable housing is the largest LISC program area. While many LISC initiatives finance the construction of new homes, others refurbish existing housing stock or help municipalities reclaim abandoned "Zombie Homes".

==== Increasing family income and wealth ====
LISC supports nationwide job training and financial literacy programs through a network of 71 Financial Opportunity Centers (FOCs). FOCs provide low-income individuals with personal career coaching and job placement programs, financial and credit literacy training and access to public benefits.

==== Stimulating economic development ====
LISC works with local governments and civic groups to finance the construction or redevelopment of retail corridors, arts center and civic institutions. Examples include:

- Washington, D.C.'s Howard Theatre
- "The Platform," a non-profit co-working space in a formerly decrepit building in downtown Indianapolis.
- Retail Corridor Development through the "MetroEdge" corridor program in Philadelphia's Fishtown neighborhood.

==== Improving access to quality education ====
LISC is a major financier of charter schools nationwide. According to the LA Times, at least a dozen schools in California would run out of money without financing from LISC designed to cover shortfalls in state funding. LISC's Schoolbuild Portal is an information resource for Charter Schools that want to finance facility improvements.

==== Supporting healthy environments and lifestyles ====
LISC partners with the NFL in the "Grassroots" program, which has built or rehabilitated 269 youth and community football fields nationwide In 2012, LISC launched the "Healthy Futures Fund" to create affordable housing units linked with health care and social services. LISC's Community Safety Initiative works with police departments and local residents to improve police-community relations and reduce crime.

=== 2010s: Housing Crisis, Preventing Displacement, Impact Investment ===
In the 2010s, many of the neighborhoods LISC had been working in for decades became attractive to private development. Compounded with the effects of the Great Recession, this led to a national housing crisis, with market-rate rents becoming unaffordable to middle- and lower-income families in many major American cities. LISC offices responded to the crisis by working to preserve affordable housing and prevent displacement.

In 2016, former Virginia Secretary of Commerce Maurice A. Jones became LISC's fourth CEO. Under Jones' tenure, LISC began to focus resources on impact investing in an effort to attract private investors from diverse sectors to community development. In 2017, LISC became the first CDFI to enter the commercial bond market, raising $100MM from its initial offering of SustainAbility Bonds. In 2018, LISC helped create the first impact investing funds focused on the creative economy.

=== 2020s: Pandemic response, racial equity ===
With the onset of the COVID-19 pandemic in early 2020, LISC responded with new investments to stem the economic fallout, especially to small businesses. It launched a small business grant program that provided more than $200 million in grants to over 16,000 small businesses. The majority of the businesses supported with minority- and women-owned. It also launched a new $1B initiative over the next 10 years to help close the racial wealth, health and opportunity gap.

== CEOs ==
- Mitchell Sviridoff, 1980–1985
- Paul Grogan, 1986–1998
- Michael Rubinger, 1998–2016
- Maurice A. Jones, 2016–2020
- Lisa L. Glover, 2020–2023
- Michael T. Pugh, 2023–present

== See also ==
- Community development
- Community development financial institution
- Urbanism
- Low-Income Housing Tax Credit
