= Christopher Pepin-Neff =

American Australian social scientist

- Education: James Madison University and University of Sydney
- Occupations: Social scientist, public policy lecturer, and LGBTQ rights advocate
- Known for: Study on political dimensions of shark attacks and public policies

Christopher Pepin-Neff (they/them) is an American-Australian social scientist, public policy lecturer, and LGBTQ rights advocate. They are known for their research and findings on public behavior and shark attacks.

Pepin-Neff is a former president of the Gay and Lesbian Activists Alliance.

== Education ==
Pepin-Neff holds a BA in political science from James Madison University in Virginia (1999) and a master's degree in Public Policy from the University of Sydney (2007). They also earned a PhD in Public Policy from the University of Sydney (2014).

== Research ==
Pepin-Neff is a lecturer in public policy at the University of Sydney and their area of research includes agenda setting, policy advocacy and the political dimensions of shark attacks. Their 2013 study published in the Journal of Environmental Studies and Sciences argued that not all shark encounters are attacks and sharks should not be hunted with nets because of their reputation as killers. The study also reflected that television programs and movies imprints certain images in the public's mind of sharks, which needs to be corrected. They examined the shark hunt policies implemented by different WA Governments between 2000 and 2014 and found similarities with the 1975 Hollywood film Jaws.

In the same year, Pepin-Neff and Thomas Wynter surveyed Shark Valley at Sea Life Sydney Aquarium to examine the public perception of sharks, causes of shark bites, and public sentiment towards the culling of sharks. The study, published in Marine Policy, concluded that people were less frightened of sharks than previously assumed and that 87 percent of 583 respondents said that sharks should not be killed upon understanding shark behavior.

== Activism ==
Pepin-Neff has been an activist for LGBTQ causes. Certain reforms and changes to the discourse of policies governing the lives of people in the LGBTQ community have taken place due to their activism. They were a lobbyist for the repeal of “Don't Ask, Don't Tell,” the ban on gays in the military. They also founded Q Street, the LGBTQ lobbyist and government affairs organization in the United States.

== Selected bibliography ==
Pepin-Neff has contributed to many research books and journals.

=== Books ===
Year	Title	Genre	Publisher
2021	LGBTQ Lobbying in the United States	LGBTQ politics	Taylor & Francis Limited
2019	Flaws: Shark Bites and Emotional Public Policymaking	Political science, public policy	Springer International Publishing

=== Book chapters ===
Year	Title	Contribution	Author(s)	Publication
2016	Exploring the C-SPAN Archives: Advancing the Research Agenda	The Performance of Roll Call Votes as Political Cover in the US Senate: Using C-SPAN to Analyze the Vote to Repeal “Don’t Ask, Don’t Tell” (pp. 191–211)	Robert S. Browning	Indiana: Purdue University Press
2014	Sharks: Conservation, governance, and management	Human perceptions and attitudes towards sharks: Examining the predator policy paradox, (pp. 107–131)	Erika J. Techera, Natalie Klein	Abingdon, Oxon: Routledge
2014	Evolution of Government Policy Towards Homosexuality in the US Military: The Rise and Fall of DADT	The Rise of Repeal: Policy Entrepreneurship and “Don’t Ask, Don’t Tell”	James E. Parco, David A. Levy, Chapter co-written with Edgell, L.	UK: Routledge

=== Journals ===
Year	Title	Co-Author(s)	Publication	Issue, Pages
2020	The Costs of Pride: Survey Results from LGBTQI Activists in the United States, United Kingdom, South Africa, and Australia	Wynter, T.	Politics and Gender	16(2), 498–524
2019	A response to Clua and Linnell		Conservation Letters	12(2)
2018	Funny Evidence: Female Comics are the New Policy Entrepreneurs	Caporale, K.	Australian Journal of Public Administration	77(4), 554–567
2018	Reducing fear to influence policy preferences: An experiment with sharks and beach safety policy options	Wynter, T.	Marine Policy	88, 222–229
2018	Shark Bites and Shark Conservation: An Analysis of Human Attitudes Following Shark Bite Incidents in Two Locations in Australia	Wynter, T.	Conservation Letters	11(2), 1–8
2015	The Jaws Effect: How movie narratives are used to influence policy responses to shark bites in Western Australia		Australian Journal of Political Science	50(1), 114–127
2013	Science, policy and the public discourse of shark “attack”: a proposal for reclassifying human-shark interactions	Hueter, R.	Journal of Environmental Studies and Science	3(1), 65–73
2013	Shark bites and public attitudes: Policy implications from the first before and after shark bite survey	Yang, J.	Marine Policy	38, 545–547
2013	The Rise of Repeal: Policy Entrepreneurship and Don't Ask, Don't Tell	Edgell, L.	Journal of Homosexuality	60(2–3), 232–249
2012	Australian Beach Safety and the Politics of Shark Attacks		Coastal Management	40(1), 88–106
