= Calum Neff =

Canadian runner

Calum Neff (born 15 August 1984) is a Canadian long-distance runner and coach who lives in Katy, Texas. He holds three Guinness World Records for pushing his daughters in 10K, Half Marathon and Marathon distance races.

Neff was born in Aberdeen, Scotland to Canadian parents. He competes for Canada in the World Mountain Running Championships and in January 2021, Neff broke the Canadian 50K national record with a time of 2:51:27 in his second try at the record. Neff is also known for his work as a pacer. He paced Sara Hall in her American record quest at the Marathon Project and Keira D'Amato to her American record and Houston Marathon win in January 2022.

Neff won the Ultramarathon 50K Race at the Marine Corps Marathon, North America's largest ultramarathon, in 2023 and 2024. Neff set a course record of 2:55:57 in October 2023.

In December 2023, he won the 50K race at the Dallas Marathon, setting a course record.

Neff is a University of Houston graduate who works as an operations manager and running coach.
