= Notice of electronic filing =

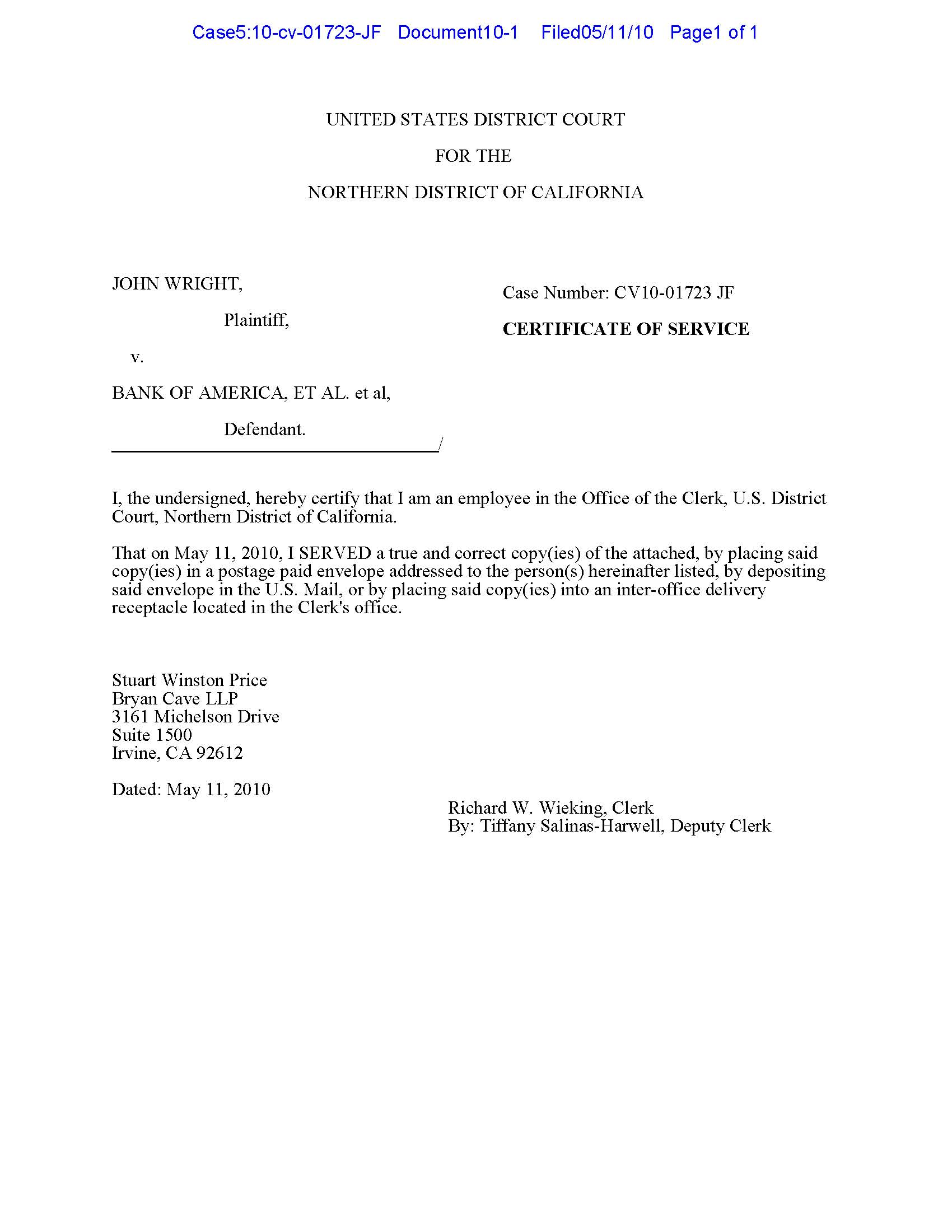
Figure 1:traditional, paper Certificate of Service, by Clerk of the Court, US District Court, Northern District of California, 2010

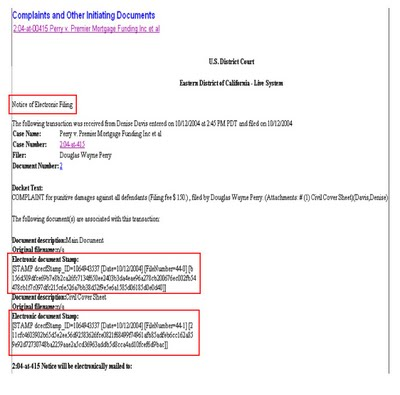
Figure 2: NEF including an "electronic document stamp" – an encrypted alphanumeric "checksum" string (in red rectangle), Eastern District of California, 2004

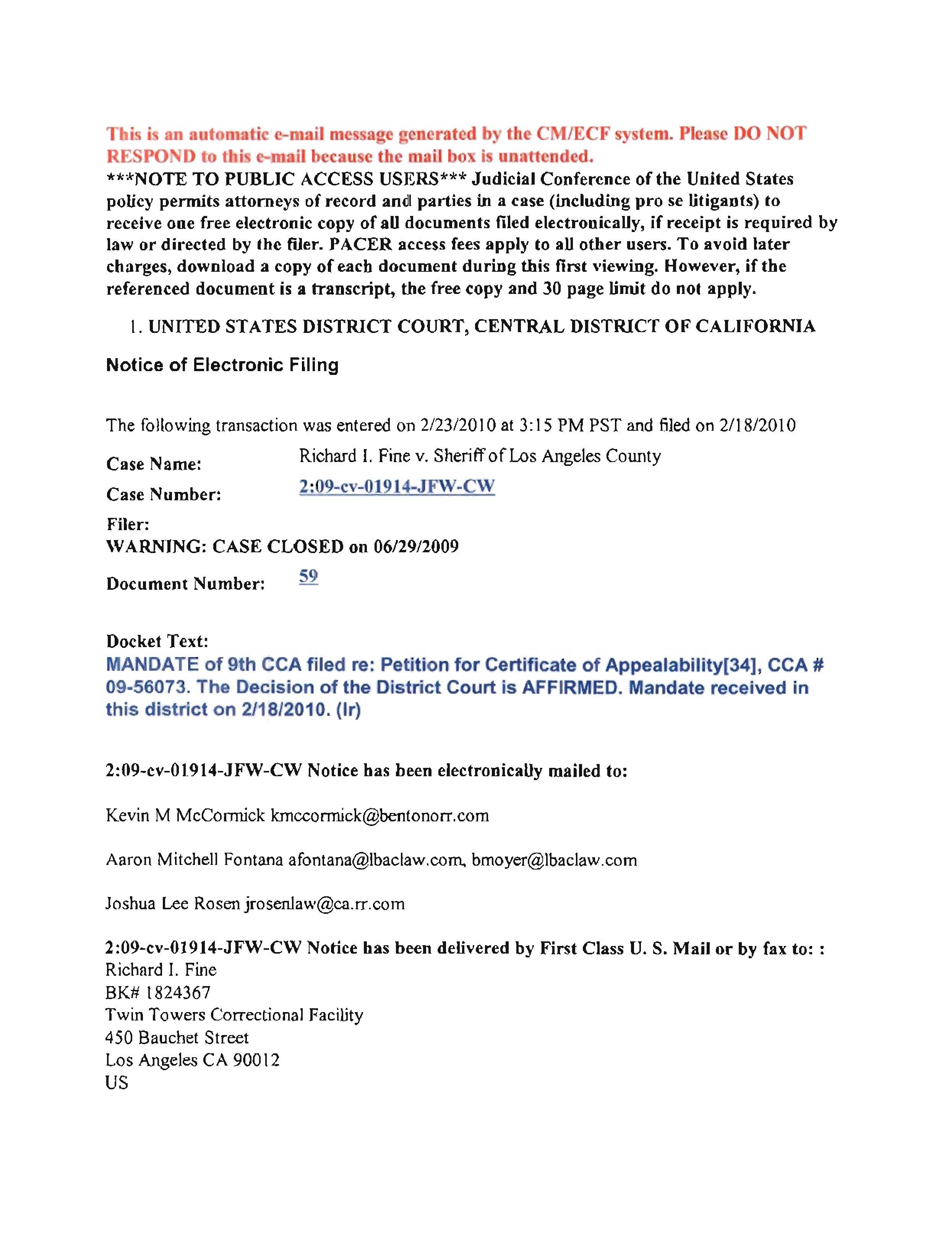
Figure 3:Invalid NEF, missing the "electronic document stamp", US District Court, Central District of California, 2010

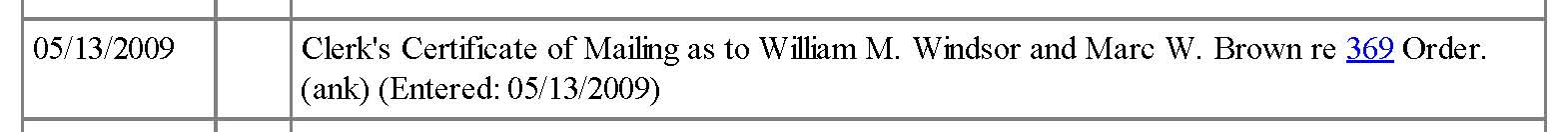
Figure 4:PACER docket notation, pertaining to Certificate of Mailing by the Clerk of the Court. US District Court, Northern District of Georgia, 2009

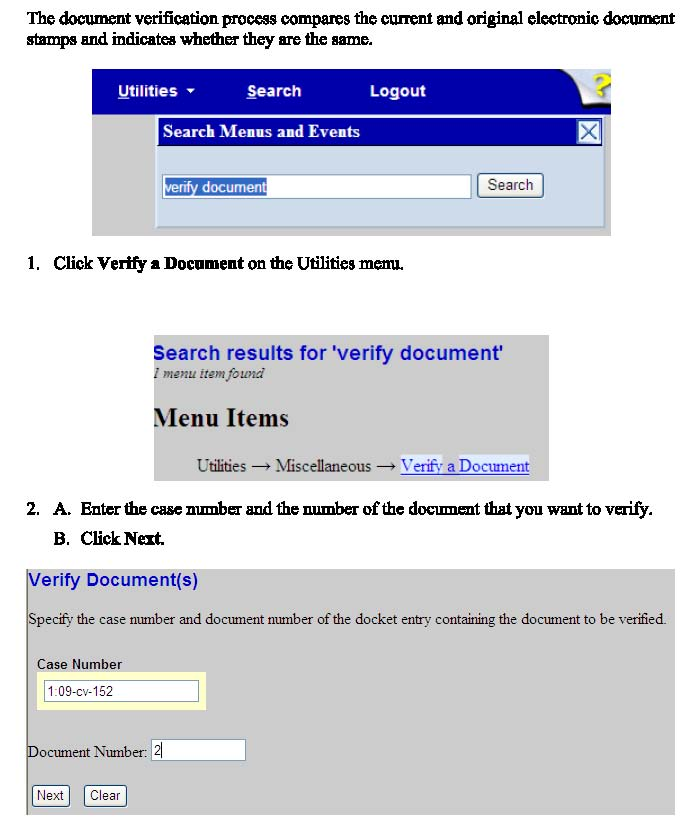
Figure 5: Document Verification Utility: Compares the "Electronic Document Stamp", as it appears in the NEF, to the corresponding document in the PACER docket, US District Court, Northern District of Illinois, 2010

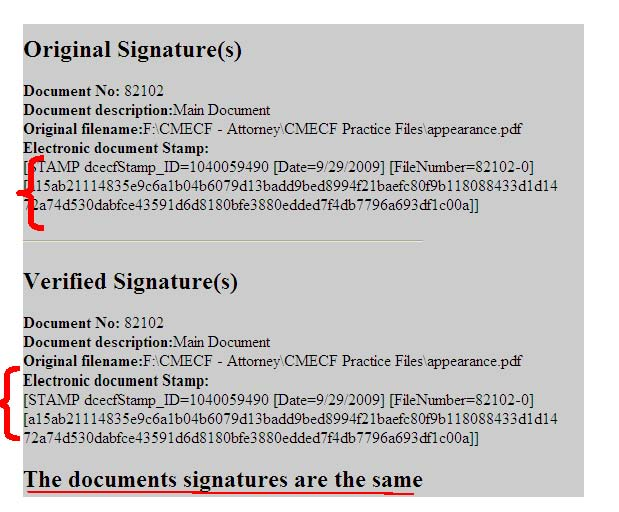
Figure 6: Document Verification Utility: Verifies that a given document in the PACER docket has not been altered relative to the document as entered with the corresponding NEF, Northern District of Illinois, 2010

A notice of electronic filing (NEF) is part of the system established by the Administrative Office of the United States Courts through the docketing and access systems of PACER & CM/ECF. PACER is a public-access system accessible by any person after registration and for a fee. CM/ECF is the Case Management/Electronic Court Filing system, available only to those admitted to a particular U.S. District or U.S. Court of Appeals. The NEF provides a record of service of an electronically filed document by parties, or of service of the electronically filed orders and judgments of the courts, upon attorneys in the case and the court. For such parties, the NEF has replaced the traditional service via US Mail or other "paper" methods. (Figures 1, 2)

== Sources of information ==
The central source for information regarding NEFs remains in CM/ECF manuals.

For example, the most explicit definition of the power and effect of NEF in the Central District of California, one of the most populous in the U.S., including Los Angeles County, remained in the "Unofficial Manual" of CM/ECF as follows (Rev 07, 2008, page 13):

L. The Notice of Electronic Filing

The system will present you with a notice of electronic filing ("NEF") screen and will also e-mail you a copy of the NEF. The notice of electronic filing ("NEF") is your proof that the document has been E-Filed. You should print the screen to a piece of paper or a PDF (or both) before proceeding, because you will need to attach the NEF as the last page of the courtesy copy that you submit to the Court. The NEF includes a "document number" and a link. Be sure to note that document number, as you will need it if you need to e-mail a proposed order to the Court. The NEF also includes an "Electronic Document Stamp" which is a string of letters and numbers which Court staff can use to verify the authenticity of the NEF. The NEF also contains the path and file name of the document you uploaded and any attachments.

A more specific definition is found in the United States District Court for the Western District of Texas Administrative Policies and Procedures for Electronic Filing.

Section 2: Definitions and Related Requirements: (page 5)

...

h. Notice of Electronic Filing ("NEF") is an electronic notice automatically generated by the Electronic Filing System at the time a document is docketed. The NEF includes the time of filing and docketing, the name of the party and Filing User filing the document, the type of document, the text of the docket entry, the name of the party and Filing User receiving the notice. If a document is attached to the docket entry, the NEF will contain a Hyperlink to the filed document allowing recipients to retrieve the document.

...

Section 7: Consequences of Electronic Filing (page 11)

a. Electronic transmission of a document through the Electronic Filing System constitutes the filing of the document pursuant to Rule 5(e), FEDERAL RULES OF CIVIL PROCEDURE, and Rule 49, FEDERAL RULES OF CRIMINAL PROCEDURE.

b. The transmission of a NEF constitutes entry on the docket pursuant to Rules 58 and 79, FEDERAL RULES OF CIVIL PROCEDURE, and Rules 49 and 55, FEDERAL RULES OF CRIMINAL PROCEDURE.

...

Section 16: Notice of Court Orders and Judgments

a. Immediately upon entry of an order or judgment, the Clerk will transmit a NEF to Filing Users. Transmission of the NEF constitutes the notice required by Rule 77(d), FEDERAL RULES OF CIVIL PROCEDURE, and Rule 49(c), FEDERAL RULES OF CRIMINAL PROCEDURE. The Clerk will send paper copies of orders and judgments to non-Filing

Users.

The General Order 08-02 of the US District Court, Central District of California provided additional information, pertaining to the significance of the "electronic document stamp" in the process of entry:

IV. Electronic Filing. (page 17)

...

O. Certification of Electronic Documents. Pursuant to Federal Rules of Civil Procedure 44(a)(1) and 44(c), the method of electronic certification described herein is deemed proof of an official court record maintained by the Clerk of Court. The NEF contains the date of electronic distribution and identification of the United States District Court for the Central District of California as the sender. An encrypted verification code appears in the electronic document stamp section of the NEF. The electronic document stamp shall be used for the purpose of confirming the authenticity of the transmission and associated document(s) with the Clerk of Court, as necessary. When a document has been electronically filed into CMIECF, the official record is the electronic recording of the document kept in the custody of the Clerk of Court. The NEF provides certification that the associated document(s) is a true and correct copy of the original filed with the court.

Although such information is derived from disparate US courts, it can be assumed to be universally applicable, since the basic platforms of PACER and CM/ECF were universally implemented in all US courts. However, significant variations are found in the manner in which the NEFs are employed. (Figures 2,3,4)

== Significance ==
As documented, above, in the texts from the US District Courts in California and Texas, the NEF today serves as the form of authentication by the Clerk and counsel of the entry of records, in same way as the traditional Certificate of Service.

The CM/ECF system includes a Document Verification Utility, which permits the user to enter the case number and document number. The Utility, available to counsel on the case and the court, then compares the current version of the document with the NEF's Electronic Document Stamp and verifies that the document, as it appears on the docket, was not altered. (Figures 5,6).

== Criticism ==
The Notice of Electronic Filing has come under some criticism for not being a public document and therefore not available to non-participants in the related case(s). This has led some pro-se litigants and others to misinterpret what an NEF is and its significance.

== See also ==
- Electronic court filing
- CM/ECF
