= National Equity Fund, Inc. =

- Founded: 1987; 39 years ago
- Founder: Local Initiatives Support Corporation
- Headquarters: Chicago
- Location: United States of America
- Region served: United States
- Method: Low-Income Housing Tax Credit (LIHTC) syndication
- President and CEO: Matthew Reilein
- Chairman: Edward Sigler
- Website: nationalequityfund.org

National Equity Fund, Inc (NEF) is a national non-profit syndicator of Low Income Housing Tax Credits (LIHTC). Created in 1987 as an affiliate of the Local Initiatives Support Corporation (LISC) and headquartered in Chicago, NEF is one of the largest non-profit LIHTC syndicators in the United States of America.

== History ==
National Equity Fund, Inc. was founded by the Local Initiatives Support Corporation to be one of the first LIHTC syndicators, following the creation of LIHTC in the Tax Reform Act of 1986. LIHTC provides investors in affordable housing a dollar-for-dollar reduction in federal taxes in exchange for equity in new or refurbished affordable housing projects. Because tax credits are typically awarded to developers, rather than investors, syndicators like National Equity Fund were created to package tax credits in large pools for investors.

In 2004, LISC created the New Markets Support Company to replicate NEF’s success using the newly created New Markets Tax Credit Program (NMTC), which supports business development in low-income areas.

== Impact ==
Since 1987, the Low Income Housing Tax Credit has become the most important resource for creating affordable housing in the United States, responsible for more than three million units of affordable housing. NEF has invested over $16.75 billion in 2,494 housing developments, creating 158,907 affordable homes since its founding in 1987. In 2019 alone, NEF invested $1.45B in 108 housing projects.

A 2017 study from the Furman Center for Real Estate and Urban Policy at New York University found that LIHTC-supported housing units like those created by NEF revitalize low-income neighborhoods, reduce crime and afford their residents access to better schools than other forms of housing assistance.

== Notable projects ==
=== Veterans Housing ===
In 2012, LISC and NEF joined national efforts to end Veteran homelessness by launching the Bring Them Homes campaign. The campaign has created more than 4,000 residences in 15 states that provide permanent supportive housing for formerly homeless Veterans. Bring Them Homes developments include The Six, a LEED-platinum certified support housing project with 18 units set aside for veterans living in Los Angeles’ Skid Row.

=== Native American Supportive Housing ===
NEF supported the Cedar Crossing affordable housing project developed by Native American Connections in Phoenix, Arizona. Cedar Crossing pioneered transit-accessible affordable housing in Phoenix with a special emphasis on meeting the needs of the Native American Community.

=== LGBTQ+ ===
As affordable housing developers began creating projects focused on the needs of LGBTQ and LGBTQ seniors, NEF became an early supporter of projects including Town Hall Apartments in Chicago and Evergreen Lofts in Buffalo.
