= John Neff =

John Neff may refer to:

- John Neff (investor) (1931–2019), American investor, mutual fund manager, and philanthropist
- John Neff (American football) (1887–1938), American football player, coach, college athletics administrator, and doctor
- John Neff (musician) (fl. 1990s–2020s), American musician
