= Nef isocyanide reaction =

Reaction in organic chemistry

The Nef isocyanide reaction is an addition reaction that takes place between isocyanides and acyl chlorides to form imidoyl chloride products, a process first discovered by John Ulrich Nef.

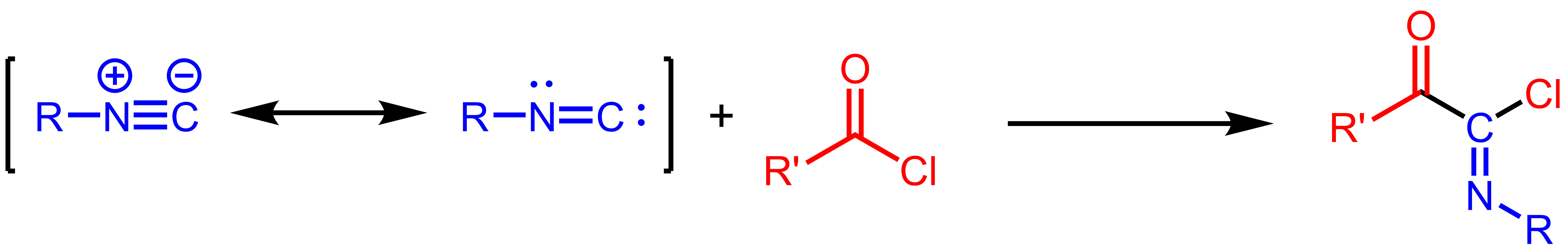

The product imidoyl chloride can be hydrolyzed to give the amide, trapped with other nucleophiles, or undergo halide abstraction with silver salts to form an acyl nitrilium intermediate.

The reaction is of some theoretical interest, as kinetic measurements and DFT studies have indicated that the addition occurs in one step, without the intermediacy of a tetrahedral intermediate that is commonly proposed for carbonyl addition reactions.

== See also ==
- Carbene
- Insertion reaction
