= John Ulric Nef (chemist) =

Swiss-American chemist (1862–1915)

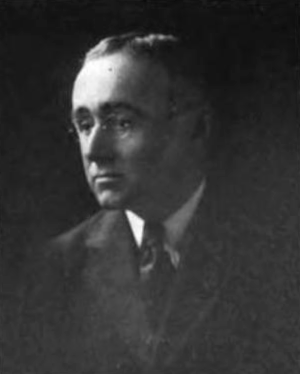
- Born: Johann Ulrich Nef; June 14, 1862; Herisau, Appenzell Ausserrhoden, Switzerland
- Died: August 13, 1915 (aged 53); Carmel-by-the-Sea, California, United States
- Education: Harvard University, Ludwig-Maximilians-Universität München
- Known for: Nef reaction Nef synthesis Nef isocyanide reaction
- Scientific career
- Workplaces: Purdue University (1887–89); Clark University (1889–92); University of Chicago (1892–1915)
- Doctoral advisor: Adolf von Baeyer

John Ulric Nef (née Johann Ulrich Nef; June 14, 1862 – August 13, 1915) was a Swiss-born American chemist and the discoverer of the Nef reaction and Nef synthesis. He was a member of the American Academy of Arts and Sciences and the National Academy of Sciences.

== Life ==
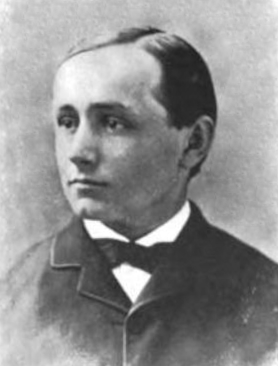
As a Harvard undergraduate

His parents emigrated from Switzerland to the United States, where Nef studied chemistry at Harvard University until 1884. Upon graduation, he joined Adolf von Baeyer at the Ludwig-Maximilians-Universität München, where he received his Ph.D. in 1887.

He was a professor at Purdue University from 1887 till 1889 and at Clark University from 1889 until 1892. In 1892, Nef joined the newly formed University of Chicago as professor of chemistry, where he spent the rest of his academic career. He died in Carmel-by-the-Sea, California on August 13, 1915.

His son John Ulric Nef (1899–1988) became a professor of economic history and published several books.

== Work ==
The discovery of the Nef reaction and the papers about divalent carbon (carbenes) were his major achievements.

== See also ==
- Phenylsodium
