= Karl Nef =

Swiss musicologist (b. 1873, d. 1935)

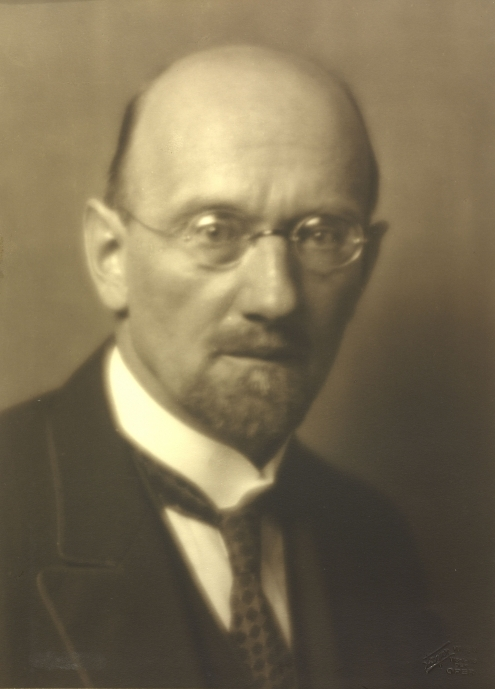
Karl Nef (1873–1935)

Karl Nef (22 August 1873 – 9 February 1935) was a Swiss musicologist.

== Life ==
Born in St. Gallen, Nef first studied cello at the University of Music and Theatre Leipzig, but then turned to musicology under the influence of Hermann Kretzschmar. In 1896 his dissertation "Die Collegia Musica in der deutschen reformierten Schweiz von ihrer Entstehung bis zum Beginn des neunzehnten Jahrhunderts. Mit einer Einleitung über den reformierten Kirchengesang und die Pflege der Profanmusik in der Schweiz in den frühern Zeiten" at the Zollikofer'sche Buchdruckerei St. Gallen. In 1897, he moved to Basel, where he first worked as an editor for the Schweizer Musikzeitung and as a music consultant for the Basler Zeitung.

Over the years he established the Musikwissenschaftliches Seminar der Universität Basel; after his habilitation in 1900, Nef was appointed associate professor in 1909 and finally full professor in 1923.

Nef died in Basel at the age of 61. His successor as head of the institute was Jacques Handschin.

== Work ==
- Karl Nef (1896), Die Collegia musica in der deutschen reformierten Schweiz von ihrer Entstehung bis zum Beginn des neunzehnten Jahrhunderts (in German), St. Gallen
- Die Stadtpfeiferei. Eine Skizze aus dem Musikleben der Vergangenheit, In: Schweizer Illustrierte, Bd. 7, 1903, pp. 540–545. (Numerized) and (Numerized)
- Karl Nef (1909), "Bachs Verhältnis zur Klaviermusik", Bach-Jahrbuch (in German), vol. 6, pp. 12–26, archived from the original on 2020-01-27
