= Nef reaction =

Chemical reaction; acid hydrolysis of a nitroalkane salt to a ketone

Named after	John Ulric Nef
Reaction type	Substitution reaction

Identifiers
Organic Chemistry Portal	nef-reaction
RSC ontology ID	RXNO:0000157

In organic chemistry, the Nef reaction is an organic reaction describing the acid hydrolysis of a salt of a primary or secondary nitroalkane (R−NO_{2}) to an aldehyde (R−CH=O) or a ketone (R_{2}C=O) and nitroxyl (HNO), which rapidly converts to nitrous oxide (N_{2}O). The reaction has been the subject of several literature reviews.

Reaction scheme for a general Nef reaction

The reaction was reported in 1894 by the chemist John Ulric Nef, who treated the sodium salt of nitroethane with sulfuric acid resulting in an 85–89% yield of nitrous oxide and at least 70% yield of acetaldehyde. However, the reaction was pioneered a year earlier in 1893 by Konovalov, who converted the potassium salt of 1-phenylnitroethane with sulfuric acid to acetophenone.

== Reaction mechanism ==
The reaction mechanism starting from the nitronate salt as the resonance structures 1a and 1b is depicted below:

The Nef reaction mechanism

The salt is protonated forming the nitronic acid 2 (in some cases these nitronates have been isolated) and once more to the iminium ion 3. This intermediate is attacked by water in a nucleophilic addition forming 4 which loses a proton and then water to the 1-nitroso-alkanol 5 which is believed to be responsible for the deep-blue color of the reaction mixture in many Nef reactions. This intermediate rearranges to nitroxyl 6 (forming nitrous oxide 6c through 6b) and the oxonium ion 7 which loses a proton to form the carbonyl compound.

Note that formation of the nitronate salt from the nitro compound requires an alpha hydrogen atom and therefore the reaction fails with tertiary nitro compounds.

== Scope ==
Nef-type reactions are frequently encountered in organic synthesis, because they turn the Henry reaction into a convenient method for functionalization at the β and γ locations. Thus, for example, the reaction is combined with the Michael reaction in the synthesis of the γ-keto-carbonyl methyl 3-acetyl-5-oxohexanoate, itself a cyclopentenone intermediate:

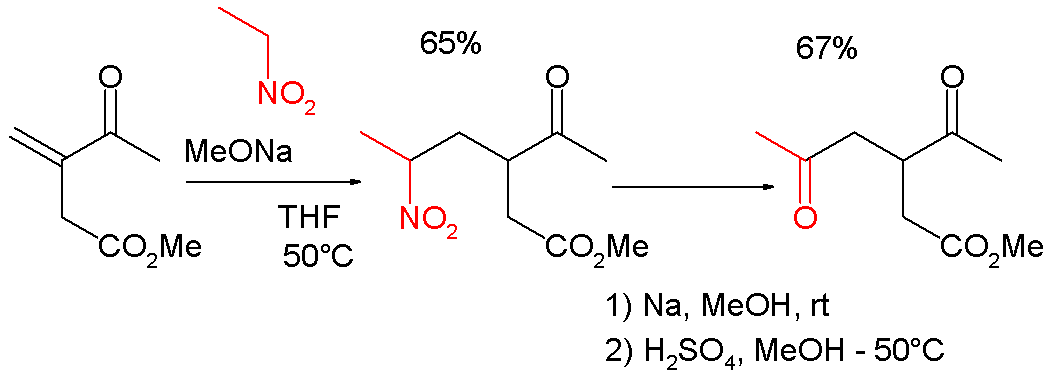
Nef reaction in combination with Michael addition

In carbohydrate chemistry, they are a chain-extension method for aldoses, as in the isotope labeling of C^{14}-D‑mannose and C^{14}-D‑glucose from D‑arabinose and C^{14}‑nitromethane (the first step here is a Henry reaction):

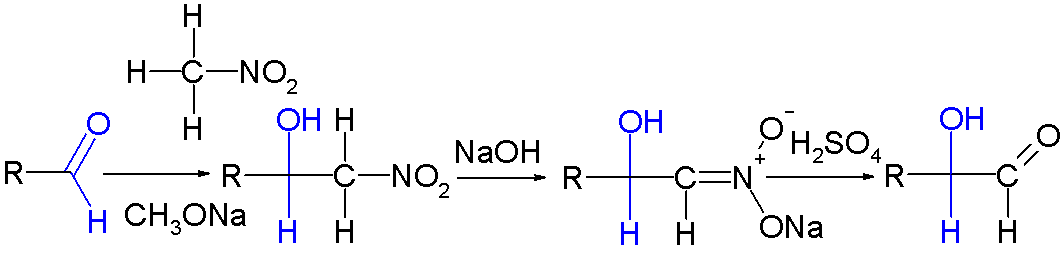
The Nef reaction: chain extension

The opposite reaction is the Wohl degradation.

=== Variants ===
Nef's original protocol, using concentrated sulfuric acid, has been described as "violent". Strong-acid hydrolysis without the intermediate salt stage results in the formation of carboxylic acids and hydroxylamine salts, but Lewis acids such as tin(IV) chloride and iron(III) chloride give a clean hydrolysis. Alternatively, strong oxidizing agents, such as oxone, ozone, or permanganates, will cleave the nitronate tautomer at the double bond to form a carbonyl and nitrate. Oxophilic reductants, such as titanium salts, will reduce the nitronate to a hydrolysis-susceptible imine, but less selective reductants give the amine instead.
