= John Ulric Nef (economic historian) =

American economic historian (1899–1988)

John Ulric Nef Jr.
- Born: July 13, 1899; Chicago, Illinois, United States
- Died: December 25, 1988 (aged 89); Washington DC, United States
- Education: Harvard University; Robert Brookings Graduate School
- Spouses: Elinor Henry Castle (m. 1921; died 1953) Evelyn Schwartz Stefansson (m. 1964)
- Father: John Ulric Nef

John Ulric Nef, Jr. (July 13, 1899–December 25, 1988) was an American economic historian, and the co-founder of the University of Chicago's Committee on Social Thought. He was associated with the University of Chicago for over half a century, and co-founded the Committee there in 1941.

== Early life ==
Nef was born in 1899, the son of chemist John Ulric Nef. He was a native Chicagoan. He graduated from Harvard University in 1920. He finished a PhD degree at the Robert Brookings Graduate School in Washington, D.C. (a precursor of the Brookings Institution) in 1927. He served at Swarthmore College's faculty for a year. He joined the University of Chicago's faculty in 1929 as an assistant professor of economics.

== Career in academia ==
After joining the faculty at Chicago in 1929, he was associated with the university for over half a century. He became professor of economic history there in 1936.

He also served as a visiting professor at French universities, Institut d'études politiques and the Collège de France, and also lectured at the universities of Belfast and Houston.

=== Committee on Social Thought ===
In 1941 Nef co-founded the Committee on Social Thought at Chicago along with Frank Knight, Robert Redfield, and Robert M. Hutchins (who was then president of the University of Chicago). It is an elite interdisciplinary graduate department at Chicago. He served as executive secretary and also as chairman (1945–1964) of the Committee. He brought a number of distinguished people he had encountered in his travels abroad such as Marc Chagall, T. S. Eliot, Igor Stravinsky, and Jacques Maritain to the Committee.

== Work as an economic historian ==
Nef went on to become a foremost economic historian. His largest domain of interest was the Western Europe's economic, cultural, and military history since the end of the 15th century. He was involved in the study of the comparative economic histories of Britain and France; his most intense being the French economic history. His early work on the coal industry of Britain and the early Industrial Revolution in Britain during the 16th and 17th centuries is particularly important. His work indicated that the Industrial Revolution was a long-time evolutionary process. He was also one of the first economic historians who paid serious attention to technology.

== Publication ==
He was an author of a number of books which include Industry and Government In France and England 1540-1640 (1940), War and Human Progress (1950), The United States and Civilization (1967), The Rise of the British Coal Industry (1932), The Conquest of the Material World (1964), and Search for Meaning: Autobiography of a Non-Conformist (1973).

== Later life ==
Apart from being an economic historian, Nef was also an officer of the French Legion of Honor, a philanthropist, and patron of the arts.

In 1979 the Society for the History of Technology awarded him the Leonardo da Vinci Medal, and in 1980 he received the University of Chicago Medal.

He died at his home in Washington, D.C. at the age of 89, after a long illness, on December 25, 1988.
