= Time Matters =

Software product

- Original authors: Robert Butler and Kevin Stilwell
- Developer: PCLaw | Time Matters LLC
- Initial release: 1989
- Stable release: 2022 / 2022
- Operating system: Windows
- Available in: English
- Type: Business software
- License: Proprietary
- Website: www.pclawtimematters.com

Time Matters is practice management software, produced by PCLaw | Time Matters LLC. It differs from contact management software such as ACT! or GoldMine because in addition to contacts, it manages calendaring, email, documents, research, billing, accounting, and matters or projects. It integrates with a variety of other software products from both LexisNexis and other vendors. Some of these vendors are Quicken, Microsoft, Palm, Mozilla, Corel, and Adobe. Developed originally for law firms, Time Matters competes with Gavel, Amicus, Tabs, and other legal practice management products. It also may be used in conjunction with Document modelling and Document assembly software products like HotDocs and Deal Builder.

Time Matters was developed by DATA.TXT Corporation originally of Coral Gables, Florida, later of Cary, North Carolina. Since its inception, DATA.TXT Corporation focused on making Time Matters an all-encompassing professional office software package, providing Calendar, Tickler, Contact, Matter, Document, and Messaging Management functions for personal computers and networks of all sizes. Founded in December 1989 by Robert Butler who was later joined as co-founder by Kevin Stilwell in 1992, the entire management and programming staff that began Time Matters' development in 1989 remained on the team until 2004, providing continuity and reliability rarely seen in software developed for specialized markets. Time Matters was purchased by Reed Elsevier in March, 2004. LexisNexis developed Time Matters out of offices in Cary, later moving operations to Raleigh, North Carolina on the North Carolina State University campus.

Time Matters for Windows has been shipping since 1994, preceded by the MS-DOS version in 1989.

Time Matters was previously available in three editions: Professional, Enterprise, and World. The Enterprise edition used Microsoft SQL Server as its database engine. Time Matters Browser Edition (formerly World Edition) served up Time Matters in web browsers for remote access to a law firm's data. An international network of Certified Independent Consultants ("CICs") support, train, and customize this product for end-users.

Time Matters Professional, discontinued with the release of Time Matters 10.0 in 2009, was based on the TPS file system developed by Softvelocity. Currently, Time Matters relies on SQL Server for its database.

With the release of Version 10 in October 2009, Time Matters became available only in the Enterprise Edition (but was sold as Time Matters). In May 2010, LexisNexis introduced an Annual Maintenance Plan (AMP) subscription program. AMP subscribers are eligible to download product upgrades and to receive technical support.

In 2018, Time Matters introduced Time Matters Go, a mobile application for iOS and Android devices. AMP subscribers also receive free access to online training and are eligible to subscribe to the Time Matters Go mobile app service for Android and iOS. No per-incidence technical support options are available.

Time Matters 16.4 released on January 30, 2019. This release provided improved integration with Microsoft Exchange Server, and improved add-ins for supported versions of Adobe Acrobat and Microsoft Office applications.

In May 2019, LexisNexis entered a joint venture with LEAP Legal Software, providing a migration option from the server-based Time Matters to the cloud-based product offered by LEAP. At the time, LexisNexis reported that they had 15,000 paying customers and 130,000 users across their PCLaw and Time Matters products. A new software company, PCLaw | Time Matters was born out of the joint venture, which continues to develop Time Matters.

== See also ==
- LexisNexis
