= Law practice management =

Management of law practice

Law practice management (LPM) is the management of a law practice. In the United States, law firms may be composed of a single attorney, of several attorneys, or of many attorneys, plus support staff such as paralegals/legal assistants, secretaries (including legal secretaries), and other personnel.

Debate over law as a profession versus a business has occurred for over a century; a number of observers believe that it is both.

Law practice management is the study and practice of business administration in the legal context, including such topics as workload and staff management; financial management; office management; and marketing, including legal advertising.

Many lawyers have commented on the difficulty of balancing the management functions of a law firm with client matters.

== History ==
Lawyers started practicing centuries ago. Law firms as an institution date back to the 19th century, and in the United States began appearing in the period before the Civil War. predating the development of modern management theory.

Today, the George Washington University College of Professional Studies (CPS) offers a Master of Professional Studies and Graduate Certificate in Law Firm Management.

== ABA Law Practice Division ==
The leading organization focused on law practice management in the United States is the Law Practice Division of the American Bar Association which traces its history back to the creation of the ABA Special Committee on Economics of Law Practice by the ABA Board of Governors on July 30, 1957. In August 1957, when Charles S. Rhyne became President of the ABA, he made one of his major objectives the institution of a “comprehensive program to aid members of the ABA in the field of economics of law practice”. He appointed the first Committee which consisted of five members and was increased in May of the following year to seven by action of the Board. The first Chair of the Special Committee was John C. Satterfield of Yazoo City, Mississippi.

The Committee was charged with the duty of laying the groundwork for the development of practical suggestions to lawyers, designed to improve their economic status. Combined with this, there was to be an increase in coordination of assistance to lawyers in the business phase of the practice of law, achieved by ABA through its staff, committees and sections and by the state and local bar associations.

An early publication from the Committee was The 1958 Lawyer and His 1938 Dollar. Satterfield was elected President of the American Bar Association in 1961 during which The Lawyers Handbook was first published and distributed to all attorneys who joined the ABA that year.

By action of the Board of Governors at the ABA Annual Meeting in August 1961, the Special Committee was made a standing committee of the Association and Lewis F. Powell of Richmond, Virginia, was appointed as the first Chair of the ABA Standing Committee on Economics of Law Practice. Shortly after the completion of his term as Chair in 1962, he was elected President of the American Bar Association and subsequently became an Associate Justice of the United States Supreme Court in 1972.

The Standing Committee on Economics of Law Practice published a bimonthly newsletter, Legal Economics News, and more than 30 books and pamphlets, three educational films, and an audio cassette program. The Committee continued to publish The Lawyer's Handbook. The Committee's staff answered over one hundred inquiries a month from attorneys regarding the application of sound management principles to the law office operation. In addition, a small group of attorneys led by J. Harris Morgan of Greenville, Texas, Kline Strong of Salt Lake City, Utah, Lee Turner of Great Bend, Kansas and Jimmy Brill of Houston, Texas, traveled throughout the US, presenting programs on law firm management. Their efforts created the need for the Section.

Commencing in 1965 when John D. Connor served as Chair, the Committee presented the first of six National Conferences of Law Office Economics and Management in Chicago, which attracted approximately 500 lawyers throughout the country and several foreign countries.

As activities expanded and lawyer interest in law office management increased, it became apparent that the committee structure could not meet the demonstrated need of American lawyers for assistance in law practice issues and limited the participation and contribution of interested and informed lawyers in the vital economics and efficiency programs of the Association. Accordingly, two members of the Committee, Robert S. Mucklestone of Seattle, Washington, the former Chair of the Young Lawyers Section, and Richard A. Williams of Little Rock, Arkansas were joined by William J. Fuchs of Haverford, Pennsylvania; John “Buddy” Thomason of Memphis, Tennessee; and Robert P. Wilkins of Columbia, South Carolina, and commenced efforts to form a section to address the subject of law office economics and management.

Proponents for a new Section originally proposed that the Board of Governors recommend to the House the creation of a Section of Law Office Practice and Efficiency, but after deliberation it was determined that the new Section should be called by the Standing Committee name. At the ABA Midyear Meeting in Houston, Texas in February 1974, the House of Delegates approved establishing the Section of Economics of Law Practice. This action culminated a two-year effort to expand the Committee's work to a much wider lawyer population.

The organizational meeting of the Section was held in April 1974 at the close of the Sixth National Conference of Law Office Economics and Management. Robert S. Mucklestone of Seattle Washington, who had served as the Chair of the ABA Committee on Economics of Law Practice was elected the new Section chair with 1074 charter members. Those chosen to serve on the initial Section Council were selected from the members of the ABA Committee on Economics of Law Practice and the Committee on Legal Assistants, other ABA contacts, speakers from the National Conferences and attorneys active at the state level.

The current chair of the American Bar Association Law Practice Division is Tom Bolt, a St. Thomas, U.S. Virgin Islands lawyer with BoltNagi PC.

== Other organizations and consultants ==
The Association of Legal Administrators (ALA) professional association, which was founded in 1971 is another organization that is concerned with law practice management.

A large number of law practice consulting firms also exist. Many bar associations have a law practice section or division which they allow non-attorney members due to the technical, non-legal basis of law office management.

== Elements of law-practice management ==
Law practice management includes management of people (clients, staff, vendors), workplace facilities and equipment, internal processes and policies, and financial matters such as collection, budgeting, financial controls, payroll, and client trust accounts.

=== Software and legal research ===
Software applications have become increasingly important in modern law practice. Picking the best software for a law office depends on many variables.

Practice management software, a form of customer relationship management software, is among the most important, and features and functions of such management software often include case management (databases, conflict of interest checking, statute of limitations checking), time tracking, billing, document storage, document assembly, task management, contact management, and calendaring and docket. Other software used includes password security, disk encryption, mindmapping, desktop notes, word processing, and email management. Some firms use modified versions of open source software.

Most law firms also subscribe to a computer-assisted legal research database for legal research. Such databases provide case law from case reporters, and often other legal resources. The two largest legal databases are Westlaw (part of West, which is owned by Thomson Reuters) and LexisNexis, but other databases also exist, such the free Google Scholar, and the newer Bloomberg Law, as well as Loislaw (operated by Wolters Kluwer) and several smaller databases.

These document automation tools allow any lawyer to create their own workflows, in the same way that companies like LegalZoom and RocketLawyer offer standardized automated document production for individuals and small businesses. Some bar associations and lawyers' organizations have their own software; for example, the American Academy of Estate Planning Attorneys' CounselPro program is designed for estate planning lawyers and assists in producing wills, trusts, and other legal documents, as well as other documents such as thank-you letters.

=== Firm personnel ===
Human resource management (managing personnel) is an important aspect of law practice management, and many books and other resources offer advice to firms on this topic.

Law firms often employ a number of non-legal personnel or support staff; according to one figure, the average attorney to non-attorney ratio is 1 to 1.3.

Many firms and other organizations employ a professional non-attorney legal administrator, or law firm administrator, to manage non-attorney personnel and the administrative aspects of the firm. The professional association for legal administrators is the Association of Legal Administrators (ALA), founded in 1971. Over the past two decades, the role of legal administrator has changes as duties have expanded and become more complex, and as more firms hired administrators; the ALA grew from less than a thousand members in 1976 to over 8,000 in 1995. According to the ALA, in 2007 some 76 percent of legal administrators were women in their 40s and 50s. The main duties of legal administrators are the financial, operation, and human resource management of the firm.

A legal administrator is similar to an office manager or executive director, but often with some expanded duties. Depending on the size, needs, and type of law firm, the firm may employ a separate database manager, network administrator, marketing director, computer systems or information technology manager, bookkeeper, accounts payable and accounts receivable clerk, and others.

== See also ==
- Alternative fee arrangements
- Attorney's fee
- Best practice
- Book of business (law)
- Contingency fee
- Document review
- Interest on Lawyer Trust Accounts (IOLTA)
- Law Practice Manager
- Legal ethics
- Retainer agreement
- Sole practitioner (lawyer)
- Trial practice
