= Wexis =

Satirical portmanteau of Westlaw and LexisNexis

Wexis is a humorous portmanteau used to refer to the alleged duopoly of publishing conglomerates that dominate the U.S. legal information services industry – namely, West Publishing and LexisNexis.

Neither of these companies is independent – they are parts of much larger conglomerates that dominate the entire information services sector. West is owned by Thomson Reuters, while LexisNexis is a division of RELX Group.

These companies dispute the allegation that they are a duopoly; LexisNexis sued TheLaw.net which used the terms "Wexis" and "duopoly" in its marketing literature.

== Antitrust issues ==
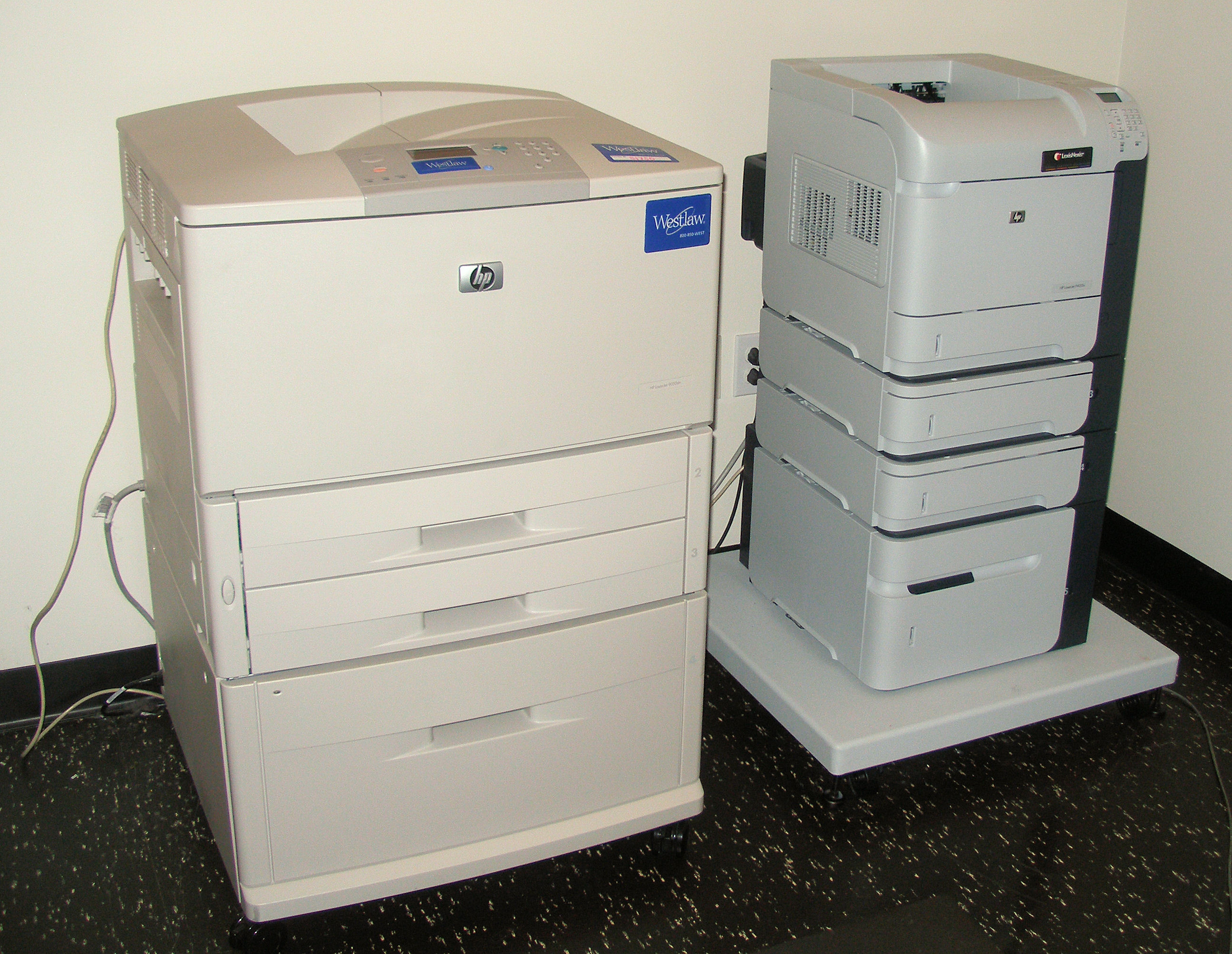
During the 1990s and 2000s, almost every law school in the United States had a pair of Westlaw and LexisNexis printers like these, to which students could print research results for free. However, Westlaw discontinued free printing for law students effective June 30, 2013.

The United States district court imposed various requirements regarding the companies' operations in a consent decree resulting from an antitrust inquiry by the United States Department of Justice under the Hart-Scott-Rodino Antitrust Improvements Act in connection with Thomson's purchase of West Publishing, and West's and Lexis's settlement of various outstanding claims in that proceeding. For example, West was required to license the "star pagination" in its printed reporters under certain terms. Otherwise, lawyers in jurisdictions that require citations to all official and unofficial reporters would have to subscribe to both online services to get all the necessary page numbers for citations in their briefs. The judge also had concerns about the Thomson and West products ordered to be divested through a sale to Lexis, primarily statutory and case law publications of Lawyers Cooperative Publishing, such as United States Supreme Court Reports, Lawyers' Edition and United States Code Service, but those sales were ultimately approved.

Both companies are known for their aggressive marketing programs in American law schools. Law students may print documents for free that are obtained through their respective services. Both companies ran programs through which students earned points (based on their number of searches) that could be redeemed for free gifts. While LexisNexis still runs its rewards program, Westlaw has discontinued its promotion.

Wolters Kluwer is the largest company which to date has attempted to establish a beachhead against the "Wexis" duopoly. At one point, it took over offline legal publishers like Aspen Publishing and online legal services like Loislaw, and also owns Commerce Clearing House (CCH). However, Wolters never developed an automated cross-referencing or citation-checking service that could directly compete against Westlaw's KeyCite or Shepard's Citations from LexisNexis. Wolters eventually sold Loislaw in 2015 and Aspen in 2021, but still owns CCH.

Bloomberg Industry Group is the best known of the remaining law publishing companies. Both Bloomberg and CCH have arrangements with Lexis and Westlaw to publish their content though those electronic services, although they also provide their subscribers web access to certain publications.
