= William Packard =

William Packard may refer to:

- William Alfred Packard (1830–1909), American classical scholar
- William Doud Packard (1861–1923), American co-founder of Packard Motor Company
- William Guthrie Packard (1889–1987), American law book publisher, owner of Shepard's Citations
- William P. Packard (1838–?), American politician
- William Packard (author) (1933–2002), American poet, playwright, teacher, novelist, and founder/editor of the New York Quarterly
