= Legal case management =

Concept in law

The terms legal case management (LCM), legal management system (LMS), matter management or legal project management refer to a subset of law practice management and cover a range of approaches and technologies used by law firms and courts to leverage knowledge and methodologies for managing the life cycle of a case or matter more effectively. Generally, the terms refer to the sophisticated information management and workflow practices that are tailored to meet the legal field's specific needs and requirements.

As attorneys and law firms compete for clients they are routinely challenged to deliver services at lower costs with greater efficiency, thus firms develop practice-specific processes and utilize contemporary technologies to assist in meeting such challenges. Law practice management processes and technologies include case and matter management, time and billing, litigation support, research, communication and collaboration, data mining and modeling, and data security, storage, and archive accessibility.

== Case management in the U.S. federal courts ==
As electronic court systems continue to increase their online presence, many now require case filings to be accomplished electronically. Many legal software vendors' products include the ability to take advantage of such electronic filing by pulling data from the case management product and pushing it into court filing systems.

== e-Discovery systems ==
Legal-project management meets traditional project management particularly in the area of electronic discovery. E-discovery in particular has a set of regularized, repeatable, and measurable practices and has been subject to great cost-control pressure for the past few years, making it a specialty within law amenable to traditional project management. The practice of legal-project management varies from the schema in Steven Levy's book to law-firm-specific regimens such as Seyfarth Lean to corporate initiatives such as Cisco’s core-and-context approach to legal work.

In litigation, the discovery process often results in enormous amounts of information that must be managed, and with the revision of the U.S. Federal Rules of Civil Procedure in 2006 to include electronic means of discovery came a new subset of case management systems that incorporated those changes, often dubbed 'electronic evidence' or 'e-discovery' management systems. Since the new rules took effect, e-Discovery firms as outside service vendors have flourished.

== Case management and the regulation of mediation in Australia ==
In Australia, mediation as an alternative dispute resolution (ADR) method is designed to avoid resorting to formal court-based adjudication and is now also being applied to criminal matters. Traditional theories of criminal justice view the matter as one between the offender and the state.

[W]hat was born of resistance and opposition to the formal justice system has been extensively integrated and co-opted into the system."

The term case management is also used to refer to systems in which court or tribunal officials assume closer administrative control over the litigation process than is traditionally associated with common law litigation.

Case management in the State of New South Wales includes governing civil court proceedings by court management rules, which are the Civil Procedure Act 2005 (NSW) and Uniform Civil Procedure Rules 2005 (NSW). The overriding purpose of case management in the Civil Procedure Act 2005 is 'to facilitate the just, quick and cheap resolution' to the matter at dispute in the civil court proceedings (s56(1), Civil Procedure Act 2005 (NSW) ).

In the case of Aon v Australian National University, a majority of the High Court noted that the purposes of civil procedure rules of facilitating the just resolution of the real issues in civil proceedings with minimum delay and expense:

"reflect principles of case management by the courts. Such management is now an accepted aspect of the system of civil justice administered by courts in Australia. It was recognised some time ago, by courts here and elsewhere in the common law world, that a different approach was required to tackle the problems of delay and cost in the litigation process. In its report in 2000, Managing Justice: A review of the federal civil justice system, the Australian Law Reform Commission noted that: "Over the last ten years Australian courts have become more active in monitoring and managing the conduct and progress of cases before them, from the time a matter is lodged to finalisation"

=== Federal Court of Australia ===
The Assisted Dispute Resolution program was introduced into the Federal Court in 1990 after a number of cases failed to reach resolutions having several directional hearings. In those cases the parties were not able to isolate the issues requiring determination. With the new program, judges can refer the parties to a court registrar for mediation. This is stated at Section 53A(1) of the Federal Court of Australia Act 1976:

(1) The Court may, by order, refer proceedings in the Court, or any part of them or any matter arising out of them:

(a) to an arbitrator for arbitration; or

(b) to a mediator for mediation; or

(c) to a suitable person for resolution by an alternative dispute resolution process;

in accordance with the Rules of Court.

(1AA) Subsection (1) is subject to the Rules of Court.

(1A) Referrals under subsection (1) (other than to an arbitrator) may be made with or without the consent of the parties to the proceedings. Referrals to an arbitrator may be made only with the consent of the parties.

It is not necessary to have the parties consent to the mediation process and a judge can direct the mediation. In this sense, case management is designed to identify and define issues in dispute and to reduce delays, costs and unnecessary pre-trial activities.

== Case management in the United Kingdom ==
In England and Wales, the Civil Procedure Rules require courts and practitioners to pursue "active case management". These new rules were introduced in 1997 following the passage of the Civil Procedure Act 1997. CPR 1.4(1) states that:

The court must further the overriding objective by actively managing cases.

The "overriding objective" is to enable the courts "to deal with cases justly and at proportionate cost". The scope of "active case management" is outlined in CPR 1.4(2): among the requirements set out there are the identification of all issues "at an early stage" and the need for cooperation between the parties involved in a legal dispute.

By contrast, the overriding objective of the Criminal Procedure Rules does not require the courts to seek to deal with cases "at proportionate cost"—rather, merely "justly". Whether the overriding objective to handle cases "at proportionate cost" includes recommending alternative dispute resolution or requiring it is a point that the courts have debated (contrast the 2004 decision in Halsey v Milton Keynes General NHS Trust with the 2023 decision in Churchill v Merthyr Tydfil County Borough Council).

In a review of the implementation of the Civil Procedure Rules after ten years, legal scholar Elsa Booth noted that progress has been inadequate:

"... while case management has undoubtedly had certain successes ... the fact remains that most of what is said in its praise – the absence of aimless drifting and an abatement of interlocutory posturing – suggests that 'active case management' seems to has morphed into, or has become little more than a case having 'direction'."

== Case management software ==
Legal case or matter management software has three main functions:

- to organize and manage the individual cases or matters that clients have hired the firm to perform, including the assignment and performance services by the firm's staff
- to record the services that the firm performs and expenses that the firm incurs in performing services for clients, including the information required issue bills to clients
- to organize, manage, consolidate, share, and protect the firm's information resources and work product

Some case management software also performs the firm's accounting functions; in other cases the case management software interfaces with firm's accounting software.

Some case management software is marketed to specific segments of the legal marketplace. Segments can be based on the size of the law firm or on the firm's law practice areas (for example, civil litigation, criminal law, real estate, tax law, etc.).

In-house legal teams (in the public and private sectors) have their own needs: generally these require less emphasis on billing and accounts (since clients tend to be internal), and even more on traceability, real-time integration and configurability. The need to improve productivity of the team and reduce costs to taxpayers, or the business, is often a key driver. Some in-house teams have reduced their external legal bills by using case management software to increase their capacity and bring case work in-house.

== See also ==
- Community of practice
- Competitive intelligence
- Complexity theory and organizations
- Computer-supported collaboration
- Corporate memory
- e-learning
- Enterprise content management
- Enterprise search
- Enterprise social software
- Expert system
- Information management
- Intellectual capital
- Knowledge ecosystems
- Knowledge base
- Knowledge management for development
- Knowledge sharing
- Knowledge transfer
- Law practice management software
- Legal matter management
- Organizational learning
- Personal knowledge management
- Procedural knowledge
