= Citator =

Citation index of legal resources

In legal research, a citator is a citation index of legal resources, one of the best-known of which in the United States is Shepard's Citations. Given a reference of a legal decision, a citator allows the researcher to find newer documents which cite the original document and thus to reconstruct the judicial history of cases and statutes. A citator can also be used to determine whether a statute or regulation has been amended, repealed, superseded, or held unconstitutional. Using a citator in this way is colloquially referred to as "Shepardizing".

== Use in legal research ==
=== Topical research ===
Because cases cite related cases, citators can be used to find cases which are on topics related to a given topic. A common research strategy is to use "one good case" to find related cases.

=== Establishing authority ===
Another important application is to determine whether the conclusions of one case have been followed, overturned, or modified in later cases, especially by higher courts. This is important for legal systems in which the binding authority of a case is contingent on precedent.

Citators often include annotations indicating the history and treatment of a case in citing opinions. Shepard's notes 'history' as affirmed, modified, reversed, same case, Superseded, or vacated; and 'treatment' as criticised, distinguished, explained, j dissenting opinion, ~ consenting opinion, Limited, overruled, or questioned.

Although originally distributed only as printed and bound volumes, citators are now typically on-line services such as LexisNexis's online Shepard's Citations, Justis Publishing's provider-neutral JustCite, Westlaw's KeyCite, Bloomberg Law's BCite, and the Oxford Law Citator of Oxford University Press.

== History ==
Citation indexes to the Bible date to the 13th century.

In English legal literature, volumes of judicial reports included lists of cases cited in that volume starting with Raymond's Reports (1743) and followed by Douglas's Reports (1783). Simon Greenleaf (1821) published an alphabetical list of cases with notes on later decisions affecting the precedential authority of the original decision.

The first true citation index dates to the 1860 publication of Labatt's Table of Cases...California..., followed in 1872 by Wait's Table of Cases...New York.... But the most important and best-known citation index came with the 1873 publication of Shepard's Citations.

Frank Shepard Company started publishing citators in New York City in 1873 and other companies provided similar services at around the same time, e.g. George Fred Williams's Massachusetts citations: a table of cases, overruled, denied, doubted, criticised, approved, and cited by the Supreme Judicial Court (Boston, 1878).

The name 'citator' appears to have been coined by the Citator Publishing Company (Detroit) in 1908 in The Citator: an annotated compilation of citations of the Kansas Supreme Court....
