= Frank Sheppard =

Frank Sheppard may refer to:

- Frank Sheppard (ice hockey) (1905—1996), Canadian ice hockey player
- Frank Sheppard (trade unionist) (1861–1956), British trade unionist and politician

== See also ==
- Frank Shepard (1848–1902), salesman for a Chicago legal publisher
- Francis Sheppard (1921–2018), historian of London and topographical writer
- Francis M. Sheppard (1868–1948), Mississippi politician
