= Packard Stadium =

Former ASU baseball stadium in Tempe, Arizona

- Interactive map of Packard Stadium
- Location: Arizona State University; Tempe, Arizona, U.S.
- Coordinates: 33°25′41″N 111°55′39″W
- Owner: Arizona State University
- Operator: Arizona State University
- Capacity: 7,875
- Surface: Natural grass

Construction
- Opened: 1974
- Renovated: 1997
- Closed: 2014
- Demolished: No
- Architect: Guirey, Srnka, Arnold & Sprinkle
- Main contractors: E. F. Hargett & Company

Tenants
- Arizona State Sun Devils - (NCAA) (1974–2014)

Packard Stadium was a college baseball park in the southwestern United States, located in Tempe, Arizona, United States, located in the Phoenix metropolitan area. It was the home field of the Arizona State Sun Devils of the Pac-12 Conference from 1974 to 2014.

Opened in 1974, it was named for William Guthrie Packard, longtime president of Shepard's Citations, made possible by a gift from his children, Guthrie and Peter, who were ASU alumni.

The stadium was designed by Guirey, Srnka, Arnold & Sprinkle Architects and built by E. F. Hargett & Company.

In 2001, the playing surface was renamed Bobby Winkles Field in honor of Bobby Winkles, the school's first varsity baseball coach, who coached the Sun Devils to a 574–173 (.768) record from 1959–71. In 2006, the name of Jim Brock, the school's all-time winningest varsity coach, was added to the stadium. He coached the Sun Devils to a 1100–440 (.714) record from 1972–94, As a result, the full name of the stadium was "Bobby Winkles Field-Packard Stadium at Brock Ballpark."

Packard Stadium underwent upgrade renovations beginning in 1997. The construction of a $1 million players clubhouse and events plaza down the left field line was completed in August 2004. The structure featured a state-of-the-art clubhouse for the Sun Devil players, including custom hardwood lockers, a training room, video room and an equipment storage area. The top level of the clubhouse was an events plaza for hosted outings during games and also had an office for the coaching staff.

The outfield wall was lined with orange trees and just beyond the left field fence was the East Rio Salado Parkway and Tempe Town Lake. The diamond was aligned northeast (home plate to center field), at an approximate elevation of 1,150 feet (350 m) above sea level.

The Sun Devils have an all-time record of 2358–1154 (.671) in 93 seasons of baseball, with 33 post-season appearances and 21 College World Series appearances. With five NCAA titles (1965, 1967, 1969, 1977, 1981), ASU is tied for third. In 46 years of varsity baseball dating back to 1959, ASU is 2025–809–1 (.714).

Packard's existence was made possible through a gift to Arizona State from Guthrie and Peter Packard. Both are alumni of ASU, and the stadium is a tribute to their late father, a prominent member of the publishing industry for many years. Mr. Packard served Shepard's Citations for 51 years rising to president and chairman of the board.

In 2013, the Sun Devils ranked 20th among Division I baseball programs in attendance, averaging 2,809 per home game.

== Move to Phoenix Municipal Stadium ==
In 2013, The Arizona Board of Regents approved Arizona State University's 25-year lease to Phoenix Municipal Stadium, which is 2.5 miles (4.0 km) northwest of the Tempe campus. The ASU baseball program has history at the site, as Sun Devil Reggie Jackson was the first college player to hit a home run out of Phoenix Municipal Stadium. The Sun Devils began playing at Phoenix Muni in 2015 after which Packard Stadium was redeveloped to help pay for improvements to Sun Devil Stadium.
