= Law practice manager =

A law practice manager, sometimes described as a legal practice manager, law office manager or director of practice support, is a person with managerial responsibilities at a law firm. The duties of a law practice manager will depend upon the specific role and its purpose.

A partner in a law firm may hold management responsibilities and will usually also engage in fee earning work. The Partner with overall responsibility for the management of a law firm is usually known as the Managing Partner. It is also possible that a law practice manager will be a non-lawyer employee of a firm, under the supervision of the law firm's managing partner or director.

In the UK, managers and owners of law firms may also be the Director of a Company, or a Sole Practitioner - a solicitor who usually works alone and has sole responsibility for their work as a lawyer and for the operation of their business.

Managers at law firms may also hold specific responsibilities within law firms such as Human Resources, Information Technology, or Marketing and Business Development.

Duties vary between law firms, but they may include any of the following responsibilities.

== Financial ==
- The financial administration of the law office including book-keeping, billing, bank account reconciliation and debt recovery
- Completing and filing tax documents including Value Added Tax returns (UK), employee tax and monthly payroll payments
- Working with accountants to provide documentation and information required for the purpose of completing annual accounts and returns
- Managing cash-flow and credit control
- Banking duties including checking and processing payments, paying in cheques.
- Preparing financial reports including cash-flow forecasts, unpaid bills, profit and loss, and expense budgets

== Human resource management ==
- Managing the recruitment of staff including working with recruitment agents, placing recruitment advertisements, reviewing job applications and organising and attending interviews
- Managing all staff including organising and attending appraisals, maintaining personnel files and identifying development staff objectives
- Dealing with employee grievances and disciplinary processes
- Providing day to day guidance to support staff relating to their duties and responsibilities
- Organising training for staff and completing training records

== Legal compliance ==
- Identifying relevant legislation that applies to the law office and their staff and ensuring compliance through implementing relevant procedures and drafting appropriate documentation, including data protection, health and safety, business, and legal services regulatory law

Completing indemnity insurance renewals. Practice certificate renewals, Lexcel adherence and implementation of new plans and policies. Lender panel applications.

== Administration ==
- Initiating and maintaining relationships with suppliers of products and services
- Ordering stationery and other supplies required for day to day use in the office
- Maintaining office records relating to (for example) health and safety incidents, risks, breaches of procedure and regulations, expenses, taxation, contracts with suppliers, law library books and borrowings
- Answering the telephone, greeting clients, and checking the general office email address.
- Creating new client files and completing file opening procedures.

== Information technology ==
- Providing training and support to staff on using software
- Ensuring software is up to date
- Researching and testing new software and hardware for business use
- Ordering hardware and setting this up for use by staff

== Premises management ==
- Ensuring business premises hold appropriate insurance and that fittings and office equipment is checked and maintained by professionals
- Initiating and maintaining security processes and procedures including fire alarm checks, security and evacuations
- Maintaining records relating to the premises including fixture and fittings records, health and safety checks, lease agreements and correspondence
- Ensuring premises look professional and clean through organising and supervising cleaning, placement of publicity, etc.

== Business development ==
- Developing a marketing plan, usually in conjunction with the Managing Partner or Director
- Performing duties required to implement the marketing plan and performing administrative duties relating to marketing such as placing advertisements, drafting and sending out newsletters and updates to the website
- Administering client feedback forms and compiling reports on feedback
- Generating and maintaining relationships with clients

== See also ==
- Law practice management
