= The Law of Advertising and Mass Communications =

1973 legal treatise

The Law of Advertising and Mass Communications is a nationally recognized legal treatise, published by Matthew Bender – Lexis/Nexis. Prior to 2009, the treatise was called “The Law of Advertising” and is still often referred to by this name. The name was changed in 2009 by its current authors to better reflect the expanding scope of the treatise, which now incorporates the most recent developments in the areas of trademark and copyright law in addition to its traditional coverage of advertising law.

The treatise began under the original authorship of George and Peter Rosden in 1973. Peter Rosden authored the treatise until 2007, at which time the treatise had grown to 4 volumes. In 2007, Jim Astrachan and Donna Thomas , principals at the law firm of Astrachan Gunst Thomas Rubin (also known as AGTR) took over authorship of Rosden's 4 volume seminal legal treatise. Since that time, the treatise has further expanded from 4 to 6 volumes, covering areas from advertising law to trademark infringement.

Some of the areas that the treatise covers include: the relationship between advertisers and advertising agencies, the relationship between the media and advertisers, the First Amendment, Commercial Speech, the Federal Trade Commission, false advertising, the Lanham Trademark Act, the Copyright Act, internet advertising and its jurisdictional implications, state remedies, advertising to children, telemarketing, and advertising injury insurance. The treatise is typically utilized by practicing attorneys, in-house counsel, advertising agencies and others involved in the advertising industry.
