= Westlaw =

Online legal research service

- Type: Subsidiary
- Industry: Publishing
- Founded: 1975; 51 years ago
- Products: Case law, articles, publications, news, court documents, lawyer marketing, law practice management tools
- Parent: Thomson Reuters
- Website: www.westlaw.com

Westlaw is an online legal research service and proprietary database for lawyers and legal professionals available in over 60 countries. Information resources on Westlaw include more than 40,000 databases of case law, state and federal statutes, administrative codes, newspaper and magazine articles, public records, law journals, law reviews, treatises, legal forms and other information resources.

Most legal documents on Westlaw are indexed to the West Key Number System, which is West's master classification system of U.S. law. Westlaw supports natural language and Boolean searches. Other significant Westlaw features include KeyCite, a citation checking service, which customers use to determine whether cases or statutes are still good law, and a customizable tabbed interface that lets customers bring their most-used resources to the top. Other tabs organize Westlaw content around the specific work needs of litigators, in-house corporate practitioners, and lawyers who specialize in any of over 150 legal topics. Most customers are attorneys or law students, but other individuals can also obtain accounts.

== History ==
Westlaw was created in 1975 by West Publishing, a company whose headquarters have been in Eagan, Minnesota, since 1992; West was acquired by the Thomson Corporation in 1996. Reuters Group was acquired by Thomson to form Thomson Reuters in 2008. Several of Thomson Reuters law-related businesses outside the United States have their own Westlaw sites, and Westlaw's foreign content is available online. For instance, Westlaw Canada from Carswell includes the Canadian Abridgment and KeyCite Canada, and Westlaw UK provides information from Sweet & Maxwell and independent law reports, case analysis and case status icons. More recently, Westlaw China was introduced, with laws and regulations, cases, digests, and status icons (similar to KeyCite flags), for the law of the People's Republic of China. Westlaw Ireland (IE) was established in 2002, covering information found in Round Hall publications as well as legislation, books, cases, current awareness and full-text articles from many of the country's notable legal journals. Westlaw is used in over 68 countries.

Westlaw is descended from QUIC/LAW, a Canadian computer-assisted legal research project operated by Queen's University from 1968 to 1973. The original name stood for "Queen's University Investigation of Computers and Law". It was directed by Hugh Lawford and Richard von Briesen, and the original code was based on an internal IBM text search project called INFORM/360. The IBM code turned out to be incomplete and required substantial modifications. In 1973, the project was commercialized in the form of a new company called QL Systems and a new product name, QL/SEARCH. In 1976, QL Systems licensed the QL/SEARCH software to West Publishing as the original foundation for what would become Westlaw.

West's chief competitor in the legal information retrieval market is LexisNexis. (Lawford and von Briesen sold what by then was called QuickLaw to LexisNexis in 2002.) Both Westlaw and LexisNexis started in the 1970s as dial-up services with dedicated terminals. The earliest versions used acoustic couplers or key phones; then smaller terminals with internal modems. Westlaw's terminal was known as WALT, for West Automatic Law Terminal.

Around 1989, both started offering programs for personal computers that emulated the terminals, and when Internet access became available, an Internet address (such as westlaw.com) became an alternative that could be selected within the "Communications Setup" option in the client program, instead of a dial-up number. West's program was known as Westmate. It was based on Borland C++ around 1997, and then changed to a program compiled on a Microsoft platform that incorporated portions of Internet Explorer. This was the first program to incorporate HTML; prior to that, Westmate had "jumps" indicated by triangles instead of "links". Shortly after that, both publishers started developing web browser interfaces, with Westlaw's being notable for the use of "web dialogs", emulating the piling of open books on a table. Westmate was discontinued on June 30, 2007.

West introduced WestlawNext on February 8, 2010. The main advances are that a user can start a search without first selecting a database, which is helpful because WestLaw has over 40,000 databases, and the search screen allows one to click checkboxes to select the jurisdiction and nature of material wanted. A new search algorithm, referred to as WestSearch, executes a federated search across multiple content types. Users can either enter descriptive terms or Boolean connectors and select a jurisdiction. Documents are ranked by relevance. WestlawNext also supports retrieving documents by citation, party name or KeyCite reference. An overview page enables users to see the top results per content type, or to view all results for a particular content type. Filters can also be applied to refine the result list even further. On the results page, users can also see links to related secondary sources relevant to their research. WestlawNext also provides folders for storing portions of the research selected by the user.

The classic Westlaw.com platform was retired in August 2015. WestlawNext was renamed "Thomson Reuters Westlaw", effective in February 2016.

== Features ==
=== KeyCite ===
KeyCite is a case citator used in United States legal research that provides a list of all the authorities citing a particular case, statute, or other legal authority.

Verification of citations is necessary, because lawyers must determine whether a case has been reversed, overruled, or modified by a subsequent case before citing it in court. Further, when interpreting a statute it is necessary to examine previous judicial interpretations. The United States judiciary operates under the principle of stare decisis – a system of legal precedents – to ensure the courts deliver consistent rulings on similar legal issues, regardless of the political or social status of the parties involved. As such, legal professionals must be certain that the legal citations they use to reinforce their arguments are accurate and still "good law".

KeyCite leverages Westlaw technologies, West's attorney-authored case law headnotes and the West Key Number System to determine and immediately alert legal professionals that case law they are reviewing has been either overturned, or may have history that deems the precedential value of the opinion invalid.

KeyCite was introduced to Westlaw in 1997 and was the first citator to seriously challenge Shepard's Citations, on which American legal professionals had relied for generations. Shepard's had become such a necessary part of American legal research that the process of citation checking is still informally referred to as "Shepardizing".

In 2004, KeyCite was the most-used citation checking service in an annual survey of law firm technology use conducted by the American Bar Association.

=== Associated software and websites ===
WestCheck is software that extracts citations from a word processing document and submits them to KeyCite or to Westlaw for retrieval of full text documents. The software consists of a standalone program and word processor add-in, either of which may be used, and a web site with the same functionality.

West also provides BriefTools, which replaces West CiteLink, and provides citation checking and file retrieval services within a word processing document. Another version only inserts Westlaw links into documents.

West CiteAdvisor formats citations and creates a table of authorities. Like WestCheck, it is available online at citeadvisor.westlaw.com, or as software for a word processor.

Westlaw CourtExpress allows searching of court docket information.

Westlaw Watch allows users to manage periodic monitoring of news and other databases for topics of interest.

Westlaw WebPlus provides a web search engine with a focus on legal information sites.

The Westlaw Litigator website provides access to legal calendaring and other litigation related applications.

Westlaw Today curates legal news and email alerts written by attorneys and Reuters reporters.

=== Key Number System ===
The West Key Number System is a master classification system of U.S. law, and is claimed to be "the only recognized legal taxonomy". The West Key Number System was created by West Publishing Company and can be described as a highly detailed index of over 110,000 legal topics and sub-topics. The index serves as the backbone for legal information published by West, which appears in the company's print publications, and now on Westlaw.

=== The West Education Network (TWEN) ===
TWEN is Westlaw's online courseware that is specifically tailored for law schools. It is used as an online extension of the classroom. Teachers use it to post syllabi, PowerPoint presentations, class materials and announcements. TWEN is also used for emailing, forum posting, live chats, polling, linking to CALI Lessons and posting/submitting assignments. (In terms of this range of functionality, TWEN is similar to other educational systems such as Blackboard, marketed by Blackboard Inc.).

Law school professors occasionally use it for their classes, and it is used by librarians and career services offices. Students can also create and manage their own courses for law reviews, journals and any student organization.

== Criticism and controversies ==
=== Identity theft controversy ===
In February 2005, after the ChoicePoint identity theft incidents became public, U.S. Senator Charles Schumer (D-NY) publicized the fact that Westlaw has a database containing a large amount of private information on practically all living Americans. Besides widely available information such as addresses and phone numbers, Westlaw also includes Social Security numbers (SSNs), previous addresses, dates of birth, and other information lawyers use to do background checks on behalf of their clients. While there is no known case of identity theft involving Westlaw, the company responded to the controversy by announcing it had eliminated access to full SSNs for 85 percent of its clients who previously could retrieve this information, mostly lawyers and government agencies.

=== Immigration-related criticism ===
Critics accused Westlaw of violating individuals' privacy rights by providing addresses, phone numbers, relatives' names, and more through the data being sold to Immigration and Customs Enforcement (ICE) for millions of dollars.

In November 2019, several legal scholars and human rights activists called on Westlaw’s parent company Thomson Reuters to cease work with U.S. Immigration and Customs Enforcement because their work directly contributes to the deportation of undocumented migrants.

=== Legal disputes ===
In the mid-1980s, Westlaw sued LexisNexis over copyright infringement. LexisNexis's "star pagination" system, a feature that let users of either research system find the printed page of a case without looking to the actual book, was found to infringe West's copyrights by the United States District Court for the District of Minnesota. After Lexis's appeals were turned down by the Eighth Circuit Court of Appeals, the company entered into an agreement to pay West $50,000 per year to license West's pagination and text corrections. No other publisher was offered similar terms, and the terms of the agreement were kept secret until they came out during discovery in the Matthew Bender / HyperLaw v. West lawsuit.

In the mid-1990s, Alan Sugarman, who runs HyperLaw, sued West. The District Court in New York and the Second Circuit Court of Appeals held that West did not have copyright on the corrections it made on opinions or on the internal pagination.

== See also ==
- American Jurisprudence
- American Law Reports
- Black's Law Dictionary
- Corpus Juris Secundum
- HeinOnline
- LexisNexis
- Quicklaw—another major competing database
- Ravel Law
- West American Digest System
- Wexis
