= Aon v Australian National University =

2009 High Court of Australia case

Aon Risk Services Australia Ltd v Australian National University
- Court: High Court of Australia

Case history
- Appealed from: ACT Supreme Court of Appeal

Court membership
- Judges sitting: French CJ, Gummow, Hayne, Heydon, Crennan, Kiefel and Bell JJ

Aon Risk Services Australia Ltd v Australian National University (2009) 239 CLR 175 (Aon v ANU) is a decision by the High Court of Australia (High Court). After a bushfire destroyed property and equipment at the Australian National University's (ANU) Mount Stromlo campus near Canberra, the university lodged an insurance claim. After its insurers disputed the claim on various grounds, ANU commenced legal proceedings against them, later adding its insurance broker, Aon, to the proceedings, arguing it had been negligent in placing the insurance policies. After settling with the insurers, ANU was granted the right to amend their case against Aon. Aon challenged the decision to allow this amendment in the High Court.

The High Court confirmed that the right for a party in a court case would not be granted merely because an amendment raises an arguable issue, but only according to the principles of effectively managing legal cases to justly resolve the issues between the parties. Aon v ANU reversed the previous decision of Queensland v JL Holdings which had held the most important consideration when assessing such a request was the consideration of justice, and that any inconvenience to the other party was curable by awarding costs against the amender.

== Background ==
=== Legal context ===
The High Court had in an earlier decision of Queensland v JL Holdings Pty Ltd decided that when one party in a legal dispute wanted to change their formal written arguments (called pleadings), the most important thing was to ensure fairness and justice between the parties involved. The High Court ruled such changes should mostly be permitted provided they helped the case to reach the correct outcome, provided the other side was compensated for inconvenience through the payment of their costs.

This approach mostly disregarded any concerns about how such changes could delay a case or affect the court system more generally. It meant parties could usually delay in making changes, resulting in significant delays and higher costs. Courts did not have the power to reject most requests, despite the potential for disruption or waste of court time.

The decision effectively allowed participants in a legal proceeding to amend their pleadings as desired, encouraging parties to delay raising claims or issues with the intent of amending their pleadings without consequence. This caused delays courts struggled to manage, leading to inefficiency, increased court costs, a strain on court resources, and eventually, increased criticism. Justice Raymond Finkelstein of the Federal Court of Australia felt JL Holdings had been applied in too many cases where paying costs was not fair and just in the circumstances. He felt the case had unfairly hamstrung courts and felt the decision should be reconsidered, with parties having been treated with excessive lenience. Critics of JL Holdings supported a return to the method adopted prior to the decision, where a judge was entitled to consider the effect of amending pleadings on court resources and other parties. This approach did not always view the paying of costs as a solution to the issues caused by a last-minute amendment.

=== Case facts ===
In January 2003, bushfire destroyed property and equipment at Australian National University's (ANU) Mount Stromlo campus near Canberra. ANU was insured by three companies: Chubb, CGU, and ACE. The insurance policies had been placed by the broker Aon Risk Services. ANU lodged a claim for property damage. This claim was disputed by its three insurers on various grounds, though they each agreed ANU had failed to take insurance out on a cohort of buildings referred to as the "Property Not Insured List" (PNI list). ANU brought a suit against the insurers, later adding Aon to the suit alleging it had negligently failed to advise the insurers of the property on the PNI list. ANU also disputed the value of its assets, whereas the insurers argued the values were under-declared.

On the first day of what was scheduled to be a four-week trial in the ACT Supreme Court, ANU had already settled with one insurer and commenced mediation with the remaining two, with which it settled two days later. ANU then sought an adjournment to add a new claim against Aon, for breach of contract and breach of duty of care. This was granted by Justice Gray on the grounds the amendments raised arguable issues. Aon appealed this decision and argued such amendments caused delay and did not abide by the principles of case management. The ACT Court of Appeal upheld the decision, and so Aon appealed to the High Court.

== High Court decision ==
The High Court majority held that parties do not have an automatic right to amend their pleadings, and amendments need to align with case management principles, including the timely and cost-effective resolution of disputes. The majority found amendments causing substantial delay and prejudice to an opposing party should be refused and that courts can consider the strain and uncertainty of prolonged litigation when deciding whether to grant an amendment. The High Court found ANU's delayed amendment was unexplained, and the late introduction of substantial new claims against Aon justified refusing their amendment.

Aon v ANU established that a reason must be provided to explain any late amendment of pleadings. The High Court confirmed that a proposed amendment will not be permitted merely because it raises an arguable issue – and that amendments are subject to the principles of legal case management. The decision reversed Queensland v JL Holdings, alongside its finding that the principal consideration in deciding whether to grant an amendment is justice, with costs being the cure-all solution to any inconvenience suffered by another party. The High Court was seen in Aon v ANU to demonstrate a stricter attitude than usual in applying case management principles.
