= Law practice management software =

Software to manage law firms' case and client records, e-discovery, billing

Law practice management software is software designed to manage the business operations of a law firm. This can include software that manages cases, client intake, court communications, electronic discovery, time tracking, trust accounting, and billing.

== Features of law practice management software ==
Common features of practice management software include:

- Case management
- Time tracking
- Document assembly
- Contact management
- Calendaring
- Docket management
- Client portal
- Contract Management
- Court Case Status Tracker
- Trust accounting

== Examples of law practice management software ==
- Smokeball
- LEAP Legal Software
- PracticeEvolve
- Dye & Durham

== See also ==
- Paralegal
- Advanced case management
- Issue tracking system
- Salesforce
