= Quicklaw =

Canadian legal research database

LexisNexis Quicklaw is a Canadian electronic legal research database that catalogues court decisions, news reports, provincial and federal statutes, journals, and other legal commentary. The database also includes a case citator and case digests. In 2002, Quicklaw was purchased by LexisNexis and is now a subsidiary of LexisNexis Canada.

The service is commonly used by law students, lawyers, and law firms in Canada. It includes citation tools that assist users in validating the authority of cases, finding summaries of judicial considerations, and locating references.
