= Frank Shepard =

American legal publisher

Frank Shepard (c. 1848–1900) was a salesman for a Chicago legal publisher who invented the Shepard's legal citation system.

== Invention of citation system ==
In September, 1875, a small announcement in the Chicago Legal News reported that Shepard was opening his own shop:

The firm of James Cockroft and Co. of New York, formerly of this city, have opened a branch office in this city at No. 8 Honore Block, for the sale of their publications, which will be under the charge of Frank Shepard, who is well known to the bar as having been in the law book house of E.B. Myers of this city for the last four years, and formerly with Mr. Cockroft. Frank is an efficient and obliging young man, and we hope he may succeed in his undertaking.

In the same year, he also designed and published the first of his many citation books, Illinois Citations. (Traditionally, the date is given as 1873, but there is evidence that he did not begin until 1875.) Shepard was surely aware of George R. Wendling's citation index, since it was published by the very firm for whom he had worked as a salesman, E.B. Myers & Co. Shepard envisioned and announced in his first publication that he would issue citation books for all the states.

Shepard also began printing gummed labels for each case, listing the cases that cited it. To help the lawyers quickly learn why one case had been cited by another, Shepard's started including one-letter codes to show that the citing case had overruled, criticized, modified, or applied some other treatment to the cited case. The stickers, or “Adhesive Annotations,” became very popular. While sitting on the Massachusetts Supreme Judicial Court, future United States Supreme Court Justice Oliver Wendell Holmes Jr. wrote “I regard Shepard’s Massachusetts Annotations as the most thorough labor-saving device that has even been brought to my attention. No one owning a set of reports can afford to be without one.” The books became so popular that the name became a verb—to Shepardize.

== Frank Shepard Company ==
The Frank Shepard Company began producing alternatives to the sticker collections: bound books that listed, for each case, the cases that cited it and codes describing the citing case's treatment.

== Personal life ==
Shepard did not rely solely upon his annotations for income. An 1889 journal carried an ad for "Frank Shepard, Law Book Seller and Publisher, 184 Dearborn St., Chicago." The ad announced that he sold the new American and English Encyclopedia of Law. It also indicated that he manufactured "[g]enuine gold leaf book labels, collection registers, legal file covers, reference book stands, legal blank cases, [and] steel engravings of eminent lawyers." No mention was made of his annotations. 10 CHI. L.J. (Feb. 1889) (advertisement).

Shepard died in 1900, at age 52, of apoplexy.

== See also ==
- Shepardize
- Shepard's citations
