= William Guthrie Packard =

American law book publisher

- Born: October 13, 1889; Oxford, New York, United States
- Died: November 19, 1987 (aged 98); Colorado Springs, Colorado
- Occupation(s): Businessman, publisher
- Known for: Owner of Shepard's Citations
- Spouse: Sabra Anne Merriam Beaumont (m. 1920; div. 1943) Helen Theresa Davis (m. 1944)
- Children: 6

William Guthrie Packard (October 13, 1889 – November 19, 1987) was an American businessman and publisher that owned Shepard's Citations and served the company for 51 years rising to the position of president and chairman of the board. He is the namesake of Packard Stadium, the former home of Arizona State University collegiate baseball.

== Early life, education, and military service ==
Packard was born in Oxford, New York. He attended the St. Paul's School and graduated from Cornell University in 1911.

From 1911 to 1913, Mr. Packard represented the New York Athletic Club as a sprinter, becoming New York City Metropolitan Junior Champion in 1911 and a member of the world record 400m relay team in 1912.

Packard entered the United States Navy upon U.S. involvement in World War I, receiving ground school training at the Massachusetts Institute of Technology. He was later assigned to flying duty at Pensacola, Florida achieving the rank of ensign and served throughout the war period.

== Career ==
Following World War I, Packard returned to The Frank Shepard Company (Shepard's Citations). In 1919, he became vice-president, secretary, and managing editor of the organization.

He was named president in 1929 and later served as president of the American Association of Law Book Publishers. The company was removed from New York City following World War II and set up headquarters in Colorado Springs, Colorado.

== Other interests ==
Throughout his life, Packard remained active in Alpha Delta Phi, the American Yacht Club, the Bronxville Riding Club, the Cornell Club of New York, as well as in the Leonard Morange Post, American Legion, Bronxville, and as a founding member of the Pikes Peak Range Ride and a member of the Desert Caballeros Range Ride.

== Personal life ==
Packard married Sabra Anne Merriam Beaumont in 1920. Following a divorce, he married Helen Theresa Davis in 1944.

Mr. Packard had six children: Merriam Sands Packard, Deborah Sands Packard, Karen Beaumont Packard, Sabra Guthrie Packard, William Guthrie Packard Jr., and Peter Davis Packard.

He was affiliated with St. Paul's Episcopal Church, Oxford, New York, as well as with various community organizations in New York, Colorado, and Arizona. He died of natural causes in Colorado Springs, Colorado on November 19, 1987.
