= LexisNexis =

Legal and business information company

LexisNexis is an American data analytics company headquartered in New York. Its products are various databases that are accessed through online portals, including portals for computer-assisted legal research (CALR), newspaper search, and consumer information. During the 1970s, LexisNexis began to make legal and journalistic documents more accessible electronically. As of 2006, the company had the world's largest electronic database for legal and public-records–related information. The company is a subsidiary of RELX.

== History ==
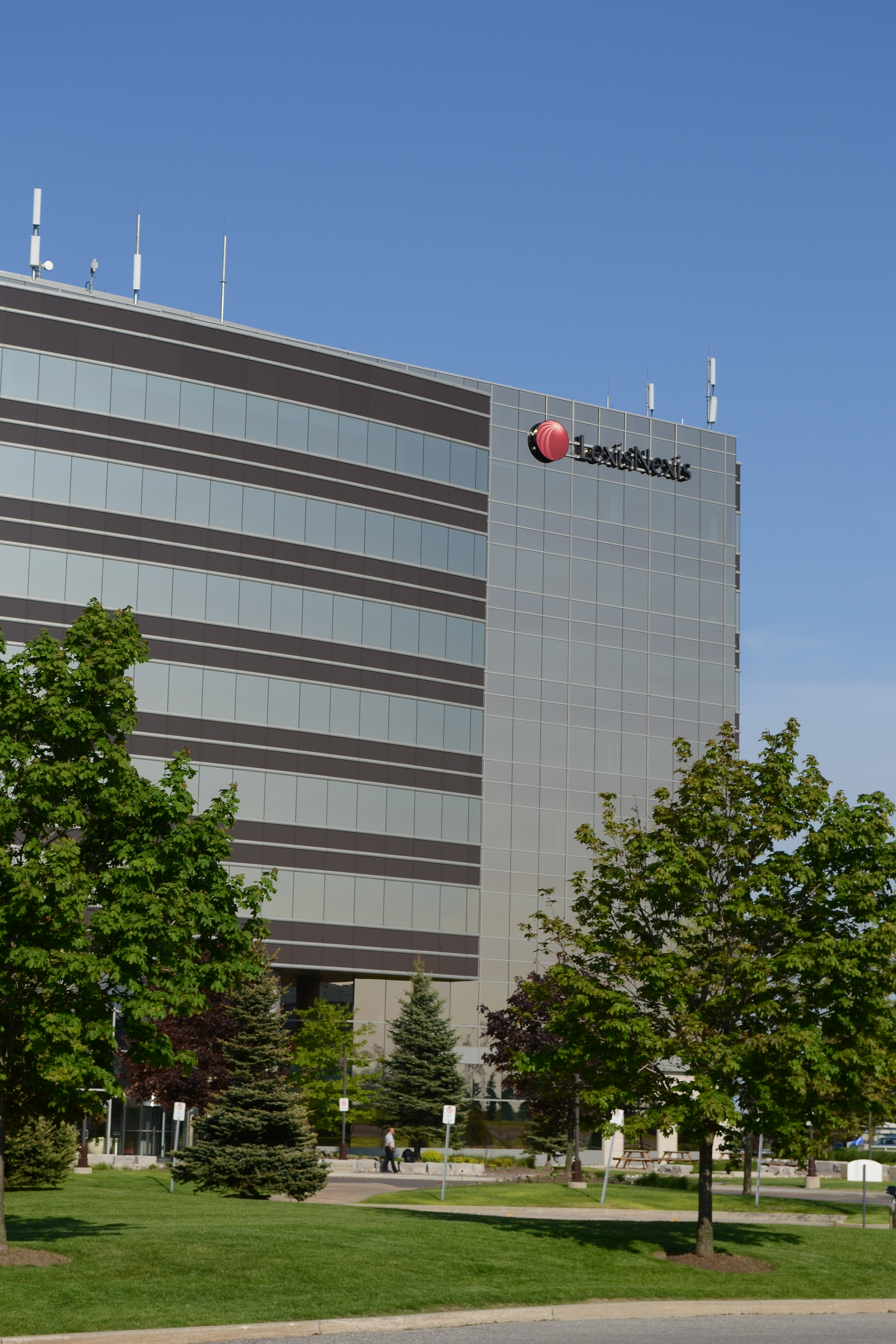
LexisNexis office in Markham, a suburb of Toronto, Ontario, Canada

LexisNexis is owned by RELX (formerly known as Reed Elsevier).

According to Trudi Bellardo Hahn and Charles P. Bourne, LexisNexis (originally founded as LEXIS) is historically significant because it was the first of the early information services to both envision and actually bring about a future in which large populations of end users would directly interact with computer databases, rather than going through professional intermediaries like librarians. The developers of several other early information services in the 1970s harbored similar ambitions (e.g., OCLC's WorldCat), but met with financial, structural, and technological constraints and were forced to retreat to the professional intermediary model until the early 1990s.

An attorney named John Horty began to explore the use of CALR technology in 1956 to support his work on comparative hospital law at the University of Pittsburgh Health Law Center. Horty was surprised to discover the extent to which the laws governing hospital administration varied from one state to another across the United States and began building a computer database to help him keep track of it all.

In 1965, Horty's work inspired the Ohio State Bar Association (OSBA) to independently develop its own CALR system, Ohio Bar Automated Research (OBAR). In 1967, the OSBA signed a contract with Data Corporation, a local defense contractor, to build OBAR based on the OSBA's written specifications. Data proceeded to implement OBAR on Data Central, an interactive full-text search system originally developed in 1964 as Recon Central to help U.S. Air Force intelligence analysts search text summaries of the contents of aerial and satellite reconnaissance photographs. (Before computer vision was invented, text summaries were manually prepared by enlisted personnel called "photo interpreters"; analysts then used those summaries as a catalog to retrieve photographs from which they could draw inferences about enemy strategy.)

In 1968, paper manufacturer Mead Corporation purchased Data Corporation for $6 million to gain control of its inkjet printing technology. Mead hired the Arthur D. Little consulting firm to study the business possibilities for the Data Central technology. Arthur D. Little dispatched a team of consultants from New York to Ohio led by H. Donald Wilson. After Mead asked for a practicing lawyer on the team, Jerome Rubin, a Harvard-trained attorney with 20 years of experience was included. The resulting study concluded that the nonlegal market was nonexistent, the legal market had potential, and OBAR needed to be rebuilt to profitably exploit that market. At the time, OBAR searches often took up to five hours to complete if more than one user was online, and its original terminals were noisy Teletypes with slow transmission rates of 10 characters per second. The original OBAR terminals were belatedly replaced with CRT text terminals in 1970. OBAR also had quality control issues; Rubin later recalled that its data was "unacceptably dirty."

In February 1970, Mead reorganized Data Corporation's Information Systems Division into a new Mead subsidiary called Mead Data Central (MDC). Wilson and Rubin, respectively, were installed as president and vice president. A year later, Mead bought out the OSBA's interests in the OBAR project, and OBAR disappeared from the historical record after that point.

After Wilson was put in charge, he became reluctant to implement his own study's recommendation to abandon the OBAR/Data Central work to date and start over. In September 1971, Mead's management relegated Wilson to vice chairman of the board (i.e., a nonoperational role) and elevated Rubin to president of MDC. Rubin pushed the legacy Data Central technology back to Mead Corporation. Under a newly organized division, Mead Technical Laboratories, Data Central continued to operate as a service bureau for nonlegal applications until 1980.

The old LexisNexis logo

Rubin then hired a new team to build an entirely new information service dedicated exclusively to legal research. He coined a new name, LEXIS, from "lex", the Latin word for law, and "IS" for "information service". After several iterations, the original functional and performance specifications were finalized by Rubin and executive vice president Bob Bennett in late summer 1972. System designer Edward Gottsman supervised the implementation of the specifications as working computer code. At the same time, Rubin and Bennett orchestrated the necessary keyboarding of the legal materials to be provided through LEXIS, and designed a business plan, marketing strategy, and training program. MDC's corporate headquarters were moved to New York City, while the data center stayed in Dayton, Ohio.

LEXIS was the first information service to directly serve end users. Rubin later explained that they were trying "to crack the librarian barrier. Our goal was to get a LEXIS terminal on every lawyer's desk." At the time, law firm libraries had paper indices that librarians searched through on behalf of lawyers; the idea of LEXIS was to allow lawyers to do their research themselves using a LEXIS terminal. To persuade American lawyers to use LEXIS (at a time when computer literacy was rare), MDC used aggressive marketing, sales, and training campaigns.

On April 2, 1973, MDC publicly launched LEXIS at a press conference in New York City, with libraries of New York and Ohio case law as well as a separate library of federal tax materials. By the end of that year, the LEXIS database had reached two billion characters in size and added the entire United States Code, as well as the United States Reports from 1938 through 1973.

By 1974, LEXIS was running on an IBM 370/155 computer in Ohio supported by a set of IBM 3330 disk storage units which could store up to about 4 billion characters. Its communications processor could handle 62 terminals simultaneously with transmission speed at 120 characters per second per user. On this platform, LEXIS was able to execute over 90% of searches within fewer than five seconds. Over 100 text terminals had been deployed to various legal offices (i.e., law firms and government agencies) and over 4,000 users had been trained.

By 1975, the LEXIS database had grown to 5 billion characters and could handle up to 200 terminals simultaneously. By 1976, the LEXIS database included case law from six states, plus various federal materials. MDC turned a profit for the first time in 1977.

In 1980, LEXIS completed its hand-keyed electronic database of all extant U.S. federal and state cases. The NEXIS service, added that same year, provided journalists with a searchable database of news articles.

In September 1981, Rubin and several of his allies (including Bennett and Gottsman) left Mead Data Central to pursue other opportunities.

When Toyota launched the Lexus line of luxury vehicles in 1989, Mead Data Central sued for trademark infringement on the grounds that consumers of upscale products (like lawyers) might confuse "Lexus" with "Lexis". A market research survey asked consumers to identify the spoken word "Lexis". Survey results showed that a nominal number of people thought of the computerized legal search system; a similarly small number thought of Toyota's luxury car division. A judge ruled against Toyota, and the company appealed the decision. Mead lost on appeal in 1989 when the Court of Appeals for the 2nd Circuit held that there was little chance of consumer confusion. Today, the two companies have an amicable business relationship, and in 2002 implemented a joint promotion called "Win a Lexus on Lexis!"

In 1988, Mead acquired the Michie Company, a legal publisher, from Macmillan.

In December 1994, Mead sold the LexisNexis system to Reed Elsevier for $1.5 billion. The U.S. state of Illinois subsequently audited Mead's income tax returns and charged Mead an additional $4 million in income tax and penalties for the sale of LexisNexis; Mead paid the tax under protest, then sued for a refund in an Illinois state court. On April 15, 2008, the U.S. Supreme Court agreed with Mead that the Illinois courts had incorrectly applied the Court's precedents on whether Illinois could constitutionally apply its income tax to Mead, an out-of-state, Ohio-based corporation. The Court reversed and remanded so the lower courts could apply the correct test and determine whether Mead and Lexis were a "unitary" business.

In 1997, LexisNexis acquired 52 legal titles (including the Lawyers' Edition) owned by the Thomson Corporation. Thomson was required to sell the titles as a condition of acquiring competing publisher West.

In 1998, Reed Elsevier acquired Shepard's Citations and made it part of LexisNexis. Before electronic citators like Westlaw's KeyCite appeared, Shepard's was the only legal citation service which attempted to provide comprehensive coverage of American law.

In 2019, LexisNexis announced a joint venture with Knowable, a leader in contract data analytics.

In February 2020, LexisNexis transitioned its database services to the Amazon Web Services cloud architecture, and shut down its legacy mainframes and servers.

In 2020, Estates Gazette and the remaining business of Reed Business Information became part of LexisNexis.

=== Acquisitions ===
In 2000, LexisNexis purchased RiskWise, a St. Cloud, Minnesota company, and acquired the American legal publisher Matthew Bender from Times Mirror. Two years later, it acquired a Canadian research database company Quicklaw, as well as the Ohio legal publisher Anderson Publishing. In 2004, Reed Elsevier Group, parent company of LexisNexis, purchased Seisint, Inc., from founder Michael Brauser of Boca Raton, Florida. Seisint housed and operated the Multistate Anti-Terrorism Information Exchange (MATRIX).

In February 2008, Reed Elsevier purchased data aggregator ChoicePoint (previous NYSE ticker symbol CPS) in a cash deal for US$3.6 billion. The company was rebranded as LexisNexis Risk Solutions.

In 2013, LexisNexis, together with Reed Elsevier Properties SA, acquired publishing brands and businesses of Sheshunoff and A.S. Pratt from Thompson Media Group.

Sheshunoff Information Services, A.S. Pratt, & Alex Information (collectively, SIS), founded in 1972, is a print and electronic publishing company that provides information to financial and legal professionals in the banking industry, as well as online training and tools for financial institutions. SIS was founded in 1971 by Alex and Gabrielle Sheshunoff. The company became recognized for providing guidance and analysis to the banking industry. In 1988 Thompson Media, a division of Thomson Reuters, acquired the company. Separately, the Sheshunoffs began publishing Alex Information products.

In 1995, SIS acquired A.S. Pratt & Sons. Established in 1933, Pratt's Letter is believed to be the second-oldest continuously published newsletter in the country behind Kiplinger's Washington Letter, which began publication in 1923. A.S. Pratt is a provider of regulatory law and compliance work tools for the financial services industry.

Gabrielle Sheshunoff returned in 2004 to unite the Alex Information, Sheshunoff, and A.S. Pratt brands before it was sold to Thompson in 2008.

In November 2014, LexisNexis Risk Solutions bought Health Market Science (HMS), a supplier of data about US healthcare professionals.

In May 2022, LexisNexis acquired the behavioral biometrics technology provider, BehavioSec for an undisclosed sum.

=== Data breach ===
On March 9, 2005, LexisNexis made the theft of personal information of Seisint users public. It was originally estimated that 32,000 users were affected, but that number greatly increased to over 310,000. Affected persons were provided with free fraud insurance and credit bureau reports for a year. However, no reports of identity theft or fraud were discovered to have stemmed from the security breach. The hackers stole passwords, names, addresses, and Social Security and driver's license numbers of customers of LexisNexis's Seisint division. Seisint collects data on individuals that is used by law enforcement agencies and private companies for debt recovery, fraud detection, and other services.

== Commercial products ==
LexisNexis services are delivered via two websites that require separate paid subscriptions.

In 2000, Lexis began building a library of briefs and motions. In addition to this, Lexis also has libraries of statutes, case judgments and opinions for jurisdictions such as France, Australia, Canada, Hong Kong, South Africa, and the United Kingdom as well as databases of law review and legal journal articles for countries for which materials are available.

Previously, LexisNexis had a stripped-down free version (known as LexisOne) but this has been discontinued and replaced by Lexis Communities, which provides news and blogs across a variety of legal areas.

Time Matters is a LexisNexis-branded software offering. Lexis for Microsoft Office is a LexisNexis-branded software offering.

In France, the UK and Australia, LexisNexis publishes books, magazines and journals, both in hard copy and online. Titles include Taxation Magazine, Lawyers Weekly and La Semaine Juridique.

Lastly, LexisNexis focused on generative AI tool for attorneys called LexisNexis Precision that can produce memos defining key legal concepts, identify and summarize new case developments, and generate common legal documents.

=== LexisNexis Asia ===
In 2024, LexisNexis celebrated Asia's Future Leaders of the Legal Profession vide its publication in their website.

=== LexisNexis UK ===
==== Butterworths ====
The firm that became LexisNexis UK was founded in 1818 by Henry Butterworth (1786–1860). He was a pupil at King Henry VIII School, Coventry. He left Coventry, was apprenticed to his uncle Joseph Butterworth, the great law bookseller of Fleet Street. In 1818, however, disagreement between them as to the terms of partnership made Henry set up on his own account at the corner of Middle Temple Gate (7 Fleet Street), where he became the well-known Queen's Law Bookseller.

Butterworths was acquired by International Publishing Corporation in 1965; IPC was acquired by the Reed Group in 1970. Heinemann Professional Publishing was merged with Butterworths Scientific in 1990 to form Butterworth-Heinemann. The Butterworths publishing business is now owned and operated in the UK by Reed Elsevier (UK) Ltd, a company in the Reed Elsevier Group. Publications continue to be produced by RELX (UK) Ltd using the "LexisNexis", "Butterworths" and "Tolley" trade marks. Such publications include Halsbury's Laws of England and the All England Law Reports, amongst others.

The Butterworths name is also used to publish works in many countries such as Canada, South Africa, Australia, and New Zealand.

LexisNexis also produces a range of software, services and products which are designed to support the practice of the legal profession. For example, case management systems, customer relationship management systems ("CRMs") and proofreading tools for Microsoft Office.

=== Other products ===
InterAction is a customer relationship management system designed for professional services firms such as accountancy and legal firms.

Business Insight Solutions offers news and business content and market intelligence tools. It is a global provider of news and business information and market intelligence tools for professionals in risk management, corporate, political, media, and academic markets.

In 2025, LexisNexis launched Protégé, a personalized AI-powered legal assistant.

== Criticism and cases ==
=== Illegal collection and sale of personal data ===
In 2022, LexisNexis Risk Solutions was sued by immigration advocates for allegedly violating Illinois law by collecting and combining extensive personal information and selling it to third parties, including federal immigration authorities. The lawsuit claimed that the company's practices posed "a grave threat to civil liberties."

=== Immigration-related criticism ===
Critics accused LexisNexis of violating individuals' privacy rights by providing addresses, phone numbers, relatives' names, and more through the data being sold to U.S. Immigration and Customs Enforcement (ICE).

In November 2019, several legal scholars and human rights activists called on LexisNexis to cease its work with ICE, arguing that the partnership directly contributes to the deportation of undocumented migrants.

=== Allegations of surveilling pregnant women ===
LexisNexis has faced accusations of selling data on pregnant women and abortion-related information. Police forces have used tools like Lexis to aid in enforcing abortion laws. St. Louis County spent almost $25,000 on LexisNexis products in 2021. The Dallas, Houston, and Missouri Police departments also spent tens of thousands of dollars on undisclosed LexisNexis products.

=== Allegations of violating EU privacy legislation ===
LexisNexis has been accused of violating the General Data Protection Regulation (GDPR) by collecting and storing personal data of European citizens without their explicit consent. The accusation was made by NOYB, a European privacy advocacy group, which filed a complaint with the Irish Data Protection Commission (DPC), the lead supervisory authority for LexisNexis in the European Union. NOYB alleges that LexisNexis collects personal data of European citizens through its legal research products and services, including Lexis Advance and LexisNexis® Academic. This data includes names, addresses, email addresses, and IP addresses.

NOYB also alleges that LexisNexis does not provide European citizens with an opportunity to opt out of the collection and storage of their personal data. This is a violation of the GDPR, which requires companies to obtain consent from individuals before collecting and storing their personal data.

In response to the complaint, LexisNexis has said that it is committed to complying with the GDPR and that it is currently reviewing its data collection and processing practices.

The DPC is currently investigating the complaint and has not yet issued a decision. If the DPC finds that LexisNexis has violated the GDPR, it could impose a fine of up to €20 million or 4% of the company's global annual turnover, whichever is greater.

=== Withdrawal from China ===
In March 2017, after being asked to remove some content, LexisNexis withdrew Nexis and LexisNexis Academic from China.

=== Violation of Daniel's Law ===
On March 4, 2024, two anonymous plaintiffs in New Jersey filed a class-action lawsuit against LexisNexis, stating that the company violated Daniel's Law. In New Jersey, Daniel's Law includes a clause requiring that if websites have published certain personal information regarding certain government officials, and a request to take it down by an authorized party is issued, such a request must be honored. The lawsuit represents over 18,000 individuals, and alleges that not only were such requests not honored, but those who filed requests were punished by LexisNexis, who "campaign[ed] to freeze the credit reports of Plaintiffs and others", and incorrectly reported them as victims of identity theft. Furthermore, additional allegations state that LexisNexis published "comprehensive reports on other family members (including minor children as young as 13 years old)", and that as of the time of the lawsuit, none of the attempts to have LexisNexis unfreeze the credit reports have been honored.

=== Privacy Class Action Lawsuit ===
On April 17, 2024, a privacy class action lawsuit was filed against LexisNexis over its use of personally identifiable information. The lawsuit was filed on behalf of residents in California and Illinois. The complaint claims that LexisNexis used this information without the plaintiffs' authorization in order to promote its Lexis Personal Records Products.

=== Other privacy cases ===
LexisNexis has been in the news for a number of data privacy issues. In 2023, the company was fined €100,000 by the French data protection authority, CNIL, for failing to properly inform individuals about how their data was being used. The CNIL found that LexisNexis had not provided clear and concise information about its data collection and processing practices, and that it had not obtained the necessary consent from individuals to use their data.

LexisNexis has also been criticized for its use of facial recognition technology. In 2022, the company was sued by a group of privacy advocates who alleged that it was illegally using facial recognition technology to scan images of people without their consent. LexisNexis has denied the allegations; the case is still pending.

The company has also been accused of collecting and storing excessive amounts of data about individuals. In 2021, a report by the Norwegian Consumer Council found that LexisNexis had collected data on millions of people, including their names, addresses, phone numbers, and social media activity. The report also found that LexisNexis was sharing this data with third-party companies without the knowledge or consent of the individuals involved.

=== Port scanning ===
In 2020, developer Dan Nemec discovered that eBay was port scanning its users using LexisNexis' ThreatMetrix product to detect remote access. The port scanning was performed using obfuscated client-side JavaScript which attempts to open WebSocket connections to localhost on ports commonly used by remote access tools like VNC. Some cybersecurity experts have speculated that this method was employed to combat online fraud, as port scanning would allow the company to detect if a compromised computer was being used to make fraudulent purchases on the site.

== See also ==
- AustLII
- CanLII
- CaseMap
- HeinOnline
- The Law of Advertising and Mass Communications
- LexisNexis Martindale-Hubbell
- LexisNexis Risk Solutions
- Time Matters
- Westlaw
- Wexis
- US Legal Forms
