= Shepard's Citations =

US legal citation index

Shepard's Citations is a citator used in United States legal research that provides a list of all the authorities citing a particular case, statute, or other legal authority. Shepardizing (sometimes written lower-case) is the process of consulting Shepard's to see if a case has been overturned, reaffirmed, questioned, or cited by later cases. Until the development of electronic citators like Westlaw's KeyCite during the 1990s, Shepard's was the only legal citation service that attempted to provide comprehensive coverage of U.S. law.

== History ==
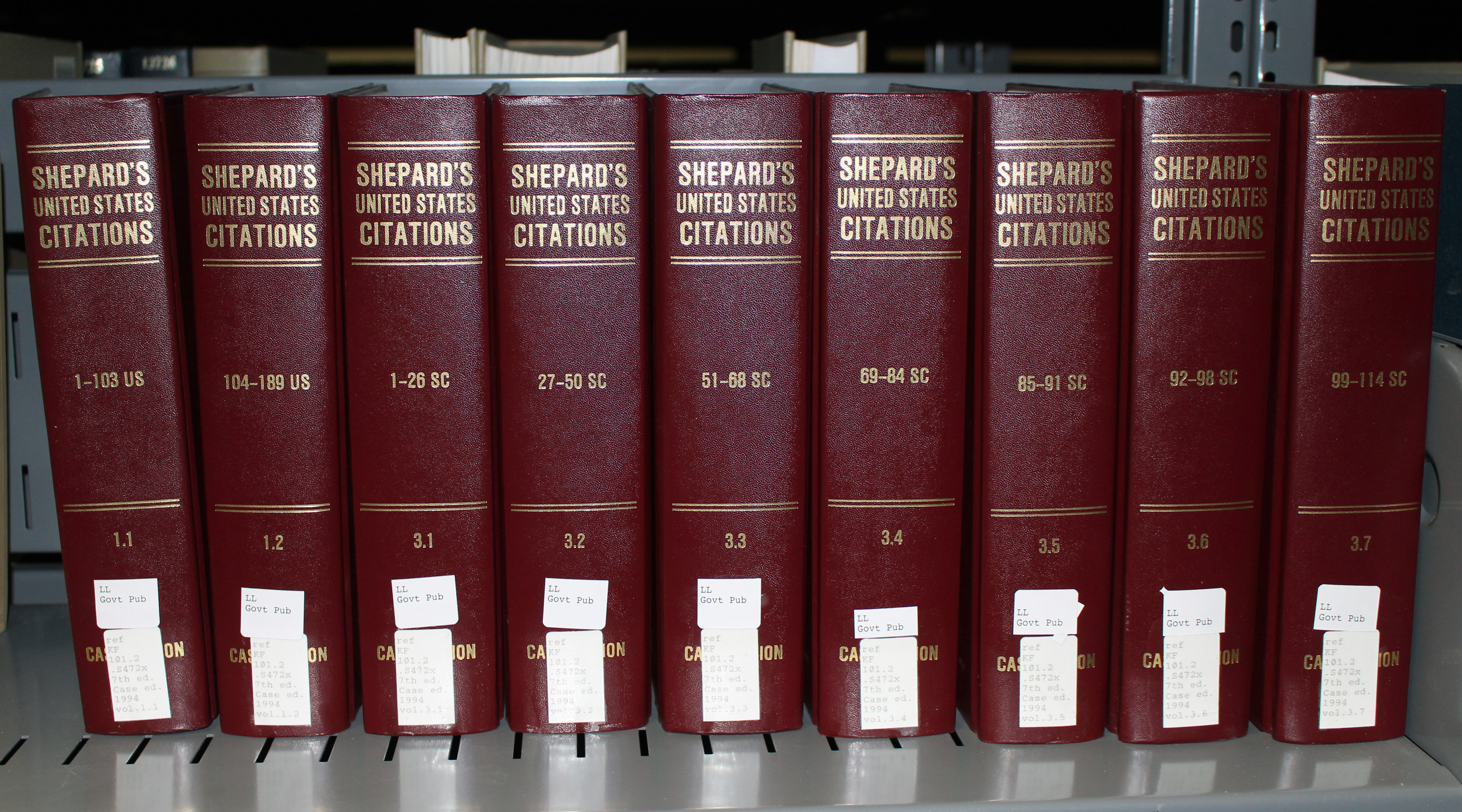
Shepard's United States Citations

The name comes from a service begun by Frank Shepard (1848–1900) in 1873 which published citations in a series of books for different jurisdictions. Initially, the product was called Shepard's Adhesive Annotations. The citations were printed on gummed, perforated sheets, which could be divided and pasted onto pages of case law. Known as "stickers", these were literally torn to bits and stuck to pertinent margins of case reporters.

By the early 20th century, the Frank Shepard Company was binding the citations into maroon volumes with Shepard's Citations stamped in gold on their spines, much like the ones still found on library shelves.

Under William Guthrie Packard, the company continued to grow. It moved to Colorado Springs in 1948; in 1951, it adopted the name Shepard's Citations, Inc. In 1966, Shepard's Citations was acquired by McGraw Hill.

In 1996, Shepard's was purchased by Times Mirror and Reed Elsevier (owner of LexisNexis since 1994). In 1998, LexisNexis bought full ownership of Shepard's. After this acquisition, LexisNexis engaged in a "multi-million-dollar Citations Redesign (CR) project" that "redesigned the way we process case law and citations".

== Decline of print usage ==
In March 1999, LexisNexis released an online version, named Shepard's Citation Service. While print versions of Shepard's remain in use, their use is declining. Although learning to Shepardize in print was once a rite of passage for all first-year law students, the Shepard's Citations booklets in hardcopy format are cryptic compared to the online version, because of the need to cram as much information about as many cases in as little space as possible.

Shepard's in paper format consists of long tables of citations (with full case titles omitted) preceded by one or two-letter codes indicating their relationship to the case being Shepardized. Before computer-assisted legal research became widely available, generations of lawyers (and law clerks and assistants) had to manually locate the Shepard's entry for a case, decipher all the cryptic abbreviations, then manually retrieve all the cases that were marked by Shepard's as criticizing or overruling a particular case, to determine whether the later cases had directly overruled that particular case on the specific holding of interest to one's client. In many jurisdictions in the U.S., it is still possible to cite a case as good law even though it has been overruled, as long as it was overruled on another holding and not the specific holding for which it is being cited.

Another flaw with the Shepard's paper format is that it was published in the form of hardcover books. These books were cumulative only through the date of publication, which posed the problem of how to add new citations after the original publication date. Like other law books, Shepard's was traditionally updated through the release of both hardcover and softcover supplement volumes. Thus, a researcher had to first consult the most recent cumulative set of Shepard's citators in their law library, then check supplements for additional citations.

In 2004, market research by LexisNexis indicated that most attorneys and librarians conduct the majority of their research online, but "that there are a number of experienced attorneys, principally in smaller firms, who still prefer print and who are extremely unlikely to change their ways".

The American textbook Fundamentals of Legal Research formerly included a lengthy illustrated explanation of how to use Shepard's in print as recently as the 9th edition released in 2009. In the 10th edition released in 2015, that section was replaced with a brief explanation that such "detail is unnecessary for the many researchers who have access to one or more online citators". It was followed by a recommendation that researchers without access to an online citator should telephone or email LexisNexis directly for assistance.

== Online ==
LexisNexis and Lexis Advance database users can Shepardize most citations online; cases are displayed with a text link to Shepardize the case and usually also have an icon indicating the status of the case as citable authority. Either the text link or the icon, when clicked or activated, will bring up a full Shepard's report for the case.

The Shepard's report indicates exactly how later cases cited the case being Shepardized with plain English phrases like "followed by" or "overruled" rather than by using the old abbreviations. Additionally, the report shows the full case title (that is, the names of the plaintiff and defendant) and full citation for each of the later cases. This is important because lawyers can usually distinguish criminal from civil cases by looking at the title. Criminal cases (with the exception of habeas corpus cases) are always titled U.S. v. [defendant], People v. [defendant], or State v. [defendant]. Often, a criminal case may cite a civil case for a point of law which a civil litigator does not care about, and vice versa.

Finally, the online report has the convenience of allowing the user to simply click on the hyperlink for any listed case to retrieve it almost instantly (if it is within the user's access plan), whereas users of Shepard's print version had to dash through long law library aisles to retrieve heavy legal reporter volumes, one for each case (and then someone had to put all those volumes back).

While most citations can be Shepardized online, there are some sources that are only Shepardizable in the print Shepard's Citations volumes. Most significant among these are the uncodified United States Statutes at Large, which are treated in the print publication Shepard's Federal Statute Citations but are not Shepardizable online. There are other more specialized sources not as widely used as the Statutes at Large that are included in print Shepard's Citations publications, but not included in the online service.

== Influences upon Science Citation Index and Google ==
In 1960, Eugene Garfield developed Science Citation Index (SCI), which he later expressly acknowledged was heavily influenced in several ways by Shepard's Citations. SCI indexes scientific journal articles, and shows what other articles they have been cited by. SCI also counts the number of citations each article gets, thus forming a citation index of the most-cited articles and journals. In turn, SCI inspired several other scientists to research the possibility of developing superior citation indexes. Examples are the eigenvalue-based method developed by Gabriel Pinski and Francis Narin in 1976 and the PageRank link analysis algorithm using the similar idea created by Sergei Brin and Larry Page, which became the heart of the Google search engine.
