= LEAP Legal Software =

AU Law practice management software company

- Type: Private
- Industry: Software Development
- Founded: 1992; 34 years ago in Sydney, Australia
- Founder: Christian Beck
- Headquarters: Sydney, Australia
- Area served: Australia; Canada; Ireland; New Zealand; United Kingdom; United States
- Key people: Christian Beck (CEO); Nik Samuelson (COO); Vahdat Dastpak (CTO)
- Products: LEAP; LEAP 365 (Software as a service
- Revenue: US$50 million (2019)
- Number of employees: 950
- Website: leaplegalsoftware.com

LEAP Legal Software is a privately held technology company that develops practice management software for the legal profession which includes legal accounting, document assembly, management and legal publishing assets.

== History ==
LEAP Legal Software was founded in 1992 by Christian Beck.

In 2010, LEAP Office 10 was launched at the NSW State Legal Conference.

LEAP also purchased BING! Software, a family law precedents business.

In 2012, LEAP Expedite was replaced with a rewritten cloud product. LEAP began rolling out the cloud version of its software to law firms in Australia in January 2013.

LEAP expanded to the UK and US markets in 2014 and 2015.

LEAP 365 was the first software-as-a-service legal application for the Australian market. LEAP 365 was released for the UK and US markets at an event at Yankee Stadium on September 12, 2016.

In 2019, LEAP entered into a joint venture with LexisNexis Legal Professional to operate PCLaw.

In 2024, a Melbourne lawyer using LEAP's AI software was referred to complaints body after AI generated made-up case citations in family court.

== Software ==
All LEAP data is stored in AWS (Amazon Web Services) in dedicated facilities around the world.

LEAP Legal Software introduced mobile app integration in mid-2013.

=== Integration with Microsoft ===
LEAP was integrated with Microsoft Office in 2002. In January 2016, LEAP completed an integration with the new Microsoft Office 365 software allowing complex document assembly to occur in the cloud rather than the desktop.

== Leadership ==
- Christian Beck, Founder
- Nik Samuelson, Chief Operating Officer
- Vahdat Dastpak, Chief Technology Officer, LEAP Dev

== Corporate development ==
=== Acquisitions ===
LEAP Legal Software has acquired several companies and brands:

- Law Perfect in 2007
- BING! in 2008
- LegalPax in 2008
- LawWare in 2012
- Peapod Legal Software in 2013
- Edgebyte in 2014
- Easysoft, Perfect Software (Perfect Books) in 2015
- DivorceMate, Softdocs & Infinitylaw in 2021
- Bradley Software in 2022
- WealthCounsel in 2023

==== Internal start-up: InfoTrack ====
Initially a division of LEAP known as LEAP Searching, InfoTrack was launched as a separate company in 2012 and has since been brought under the umbrella company of Australian Technology Investors. It had a reported annual revenue of A$144 million in 2015.
