= Citation signal =

Phrases to clarify authority in legal documents

In law, a citation or introductory signal is a set of phrases or words used to clarify the authority (or significance) of a legal citation as it relates to a proposition. It is used in citations to present authorities and indicate how those authorities relate to propositions in statements. Legal writers use citation signals to tell readers how the citations support (or do not support) their propositions, organizing citations in a hierarchy of importance so the reader can quickly determine the relative weight of a citation. Citation signals help a reader to discern meaning or usefulness of a reference when the reference itself provides inadequate information.

Citation signals have different meanings in different U.S. citation-style systems. The two most prominent citation manuals are The Bluebook: A Uniform System of Citation and the ALWD Guide to Legal Citation. Some state-specific style manuals also provide guidance on legal citation. The Bluebook citation system is the most comprehensive and the most widely used system by courts, law firms, and law reviews in the United States.

== Use ==
In legal writing, citation signals appear before the citation that is being introduced. For example:

Formatting rules for legal citations are well-defined. See generally The Bluebook: A Uniform System of Citation (Columbia L. Rev. Ass'n et al. eds., 21st ed. 2020) (describing formatting rules for legal citation and providing examples).

In the above sentence, the signal See generally is used to indicate that the source presents helpful background material related to the proposition.

== Signals indicating support ==
=== No signal ===
It is acceptable to cite an authority without using an introductory signal when the cited authority (1) directly states the proposition, (2) identifies the source of a quotation, or (3) identifies an authority referred to in the text. For example:

The United States unemployment rate fell to 4.1% in September 2024. U.S. Dep't of Lab., USDL-24-2052, The Employment Situation -- September 2024 (2024). This drop has alleviated concerns of a recession among some economists, particularly because this data comes at a time when "[r]eal-time estimates of overall economic growth remain strong." Talmon Joseph Smith, Labor Market Shows Unexpected Strength, N.Y. Times (Oct. 4, 2024).

In the above example, the author is restating numerical data from an authority and then directly quoting another authority, so no introductory signal is necessary.

=== e.g. ===
This signal, an abbreviation of the Latin exempli gratia, means "for example". It tells the reader that the citation supports the proposition; although other authorities also support the proposition, their citation(s) may not be useful or necessary. This signal may be used in combination with other signals, preceded by an italicized comma. The comma after e.g., is not italicized when attached to another signal at the end (whether supportive or not), but is italicized when e.g. appears alone. For example:

Parties challenging state abortion laws have sharply disputed in some courts the contention that a purpose of these laws, when enacted, was to protect prenatal life. See, e.g., Abele v. Markle, 342 F. Supp. 800 (D. Conn.1972), appeal docketed, No. 72-56.

Unfortunately, hiring undocumented laborers is a widespread industry practice. E.g., Transamerica Ins. Co. v. Bellefonte Ins. Co., 548 F. Supp. 1329, 1331 (E.D. Pa. 1982).

=== Accord ===
"Accord" is used when two or more sources state or support the proposition, but the text quotes (or refers to) only one; the other sources are then introduced by "accord". Legal writers often use accord to indicate that the law of one jurisdiction is in accord with that of another jurisdiction. Examples:

"[N]ervousness alone does not justify extended detention and questioning about matters not related to the stop." United States v. Chavez-Valenzuela, 268 F.3d 719,725 (9th Cir. 2001); accord United States v. Beck, 140 F.3d 1129, 1139 (8th Cir. 1998); United States v. Wood, 106 F.3d 942, 248 (10th Cir. 1997); United States v. Tapia, 912 F.2d 1367, 1370 (11th Cir. 1990).

"... The term 'Fifth Amendment' in the context of our time is commonly regarded as being synonymous with the privilege against self-incrimination". Quinn v. United States, 349 U.S. 155, 163, 75 S. Ct. 668, 99 L. Ed. 964 (1955); accord In re Johnny V., 85 Cal. App. 3d 120, 149 Cal.Rptr. 180, 184, 188 (Cal. Ct. App. 1978) (holding that the statement "I'll take the fifth" was an assertion of the Fifth Amendment privilege).

=== See ===
"See" indicates that the cited authority supports, but does not directly state, the proposition given. Used similarly to no signal, to indicate that the proposition follows from the cited authority. It may also be used to refer to a cited authority which supports the proposition. For example:

before 1997 the IDEA was silent on the subject of private school reimbursement, but courts had granted such reimbursement as "appropriate" relief under principles of equity pursuant to 20 U.S.C. § 1415(i)(2)(C ). See Burlington, 471 U.S. at 370, 105 S.Ct. 1996 ("[W]e are confident that by empowering the court to grant 'appropriate' relief Congress meant to include retroactive reimbursement to parents as an available remedy in a proper case."); 20 U.S.C. § 1415(i)(2)(C ) ("In any action brought under this paragraph, the court ... shall grant such relief as the court determines is appropriate.").

=== See also ===
This indicates that the cited authority constitutes additional material which supports the proposition less directly than that indicated by "see" or "accord". "See also" may be used to introduce a case supporting the stated proposition which is distinguishable from previously-cited cases. It is sometimes used to refer readers to authorities supporting a proposition when other supporting authorities have already been cited or discussed. A parenthetical explanation of the source's relevance, after a citation introduced by "see also", is encouraged. For example:

... omitting the same mental element in a similar weapons possession statute, such as RCW 9.41.040, strongly indicates that the omission was purposeful and that strict liability was intended. See generally State v. Alvarez, 74 Wash. App. 250, 260, 872 P.2d 1123 (1994) (omission of "course of conduct" language in criminal counterpart to civil antiharassment act indicated "Legislature consciously chose to criminalize a single act rather than a course of conduct.") aff'd, 128 Wash.2d 1, 904 P.2d 754 (1995); see also State v. Roberts, 117 Wash.2d 576, 586, 817 P.2d 855 (1991) (use of certain statutory language in one instance, and different language in another, evinces different legislative intent) (citing cases).

— State v. Anderson, 141 Wash.2d 357, 5 P.3d 1247, 1253 (2000)

=== Cf. ===
From the Latin confer ("compare"), this signals that a cited proposition differs from the main proposition but is sufficiently analogous to lend support. An explanatory parenthetical note is recommended to clarify the citation's relevance. For example:

it is precisely this kind of conjecture and hair-splitting that the Supreme Court wanted to avoid when it fashioned the bright-line rule in Miranda. Cf. Davis, 512 U.S. at 461 (noting that where the suspect asks for counsel, the benefit of the bright-line rule is the "clarity and ease of application" that "can be applied by officers in the real world without unduly hampering the gathering of information" by forcing them "to make difficult judgment calls" with a "threat of suppression if they guess wrong").

== Signal indicating background material ==
=== See generally ===
This signal indicates that the cited authority presents background material relevant to the proposition. Legal scholars generally encourage the use of parenthetical explanations of the source material's relevance following each authority using "see generally", and this signal can be used with primary and secondary sources. For example:

it is a form of "discrimination" because the complainant is being subjected to differential treatment. See generally Olmstead v. L. C., 527 U.S. 581, 614, 144 L. Ed. 2d 540, 119 S. Ct. 2176 (1999) (Kennedy, J., concurring in judgment) (finding that the "normal definition of discrimination" is "differential treatment").

== Signals indicating contradiction ==
=== Contra ===
This signals that the cited authority directly contradicts a given point. Contra is used where no signal would be used for support. For example:

Before Blakely, courts around the country had found that 'statutory minimum' was the maximum sentence allowed by law for the crime, rather than the maximum standard range sentence. See, e.g., State v. Gore, 143 Wash. 2d 288, 313-14, 21 P.3d 262 (2001), overruled by State v. Hughes, 154 Wash. 2d 118, 110 P.3d 192 (2005). Contra Blakely, 124 S. Ct. at 2536-37.

=== But see ===
The cited authority contradicts the stated proposition, directly or implicitly. "But see" is used in opposition where "see" is used for support. For example:

Specifically, under Roberts, there may have been cases in which courts erroneously determined that testimonial statements were reliable. But see Bockting v. Bayer, 418 F.3d at 1058 (O'Scannlain, J., dissenting from denial of rehearing en banc).

=== But cf. ===
The cited authority contradicts the stated proposition by analogy; a parenthetical explanation of the source's relevance is recommended. For example:

But cf. 995 F.2d, at 1137 (observing that "[i]n the ordinary tort claim arising when a government driver negligently runs into another car, jury trial is precisely what is lost to a plaintiff when the government is substituted for the employee").

"But" should be omitted from "but see" and "but cf." when the signal follows another negative signal:

Contra Blake v. Kiline, 612 F.2d 718, 723-24 (3d Cir. 1979); see CHARLES ALAN WRIGHT, LAW OF FEDERAL COURTS 48 (4th ed. 1983).

== Signals indicating comparison ==
=== Compare ===
This signal compares two or more authorities who reach different outcomes for a stated proposition. Because the relevance of the comparison may not be readily apparent to the reader, The Bluebook recommends adding a parenthetical explanation after each authority. Either "compare" or "with" may be followed by more than one source, using "and" between each. Legal writers italicize "compare", "with" and "and". "Compare" is used with "with", with the "with" preceded by a comma. If "and" is used, it is also preceded by a comma. For example:

To characterize the first element as a "distortion", however, requires the concurrence to second-guess the way in which the state court resolved a plain conflict in the language of different statutes. Compare Fla. Stat. 102.166 (2001) (foreseeing manual recounts during the protest period), with 102.111 (setting what is arguably too short a deadline for manual recounts to be conducted); compare 102.112(1) (stating that the Secretary "may" ignore late returns), with 102.111(1) (stating that the Secretary "shall" ignore late returns).

== Signals as verbs ==
In footnotes, signals may function as verbs in sentences; this allows material which would otherwise be included in a parenthetical explanation to be integrated. When used in this manner, signals should not be italicized.

See Christina L. Anderson, Comment, Double Jeopardy: The Modern Dilemma for Juvenile Justice, 152 U. Pa. L. Rev. 1181, 1204-07 (2004) (discussing four main types of restorative justice programs)

becomes:

See Christina L. Anderson, Comment, Double Jeopardy: The Modern Dilemma for Juvenile Justice, 152 U. Pa. L. Rev. 1181, 1204-07 (2004), for a discussion of restorative justice as a reasonable replacement for retributive sanctions.

"Cf." becomes "compare" and "e.g." becomes "for example" when the signals are used as verbs.

== Formatting ==
=== Capitalization ===
The first letter of a signal should be capitalized when it begins a citation sentence. If it is in a citation clause or sentence, it should not be capitalized.

=== Placement and typeface ===
One space should separate an introductory signal from the rest of the citation, with no punctuation between. For example:

See American Trucking Associations v. United States EPA, 195 F.3d 4 (D.C. Cir. 1999).

Do not italicize a signal used as a verb; for example:

for a discussion of the Environmental Protection Agency's failure to interpret a statute to provide intelligible principles, see American Trucking Associations v. United States EPA, 195 F.3d 4 (D.C. Cir. 1999).

=== Order ===
When one or more signals are used, the signals should appear in the following order:

- Introductory signals
  - No signal
  - e.g.,
  - Accord
  - See
  - See also
  - Cf.
- Signals indicating comparison
  - Compare
- Signals indicating contradiction
  - Contra
  - But see
  - But cf.
- Signal indicating background material
  - See generally

When multiple signals are used, they must be consistent with this order. Signals of the same basic type - supportive, comparative, contradictory or background - are strung together in a single citation sentence, separated by semicolons. Signals of different types should be grouped in different citation sentences. For example:

See Mass. Bd. of Ret. v. Murgia, 427 U.S. 307 (1976) (per curiam); cf. Palmer v. Ticcione, 433 F.Supp. 653 (E.D.N.Y 1977) (upholding a mandatory retirement age for kindergarten teachers). But see Gault v. Garrison, 569 F.2d 993 (7th Cir. 1977) (holding that a classification of public school teachers based on age violated equal protection absent a showing of justifiable and rational state purpose). See generally Comment, O'Neill v. Baine: Application of Middle-Level Scrutiny to Old-Age Classifications, 127 U. Pa. L. Rev. 798 (1979) (advocating a new constitutional approach to old-age classifications).

When e.g. is combined with another signal, the placement of the combined signal is determined by the non-e.g. signal; the combined signal "see, e.g." should be placed where the "see" signal would normally be. In a citation clause, citation strings may contain different types of signals; these signals are separated by semicolons.

=== Order of authorities ===
Authorities in a signal are separated by semicolons. If an authority is more helpful or authoritative than others cited in a signal, it should precede them. Otherwise, authorities are cited in the following order:

1. Constitutions and other foundation documents
  1. Federal
  2. State (alphabetically by name)
  3. Foreign (alphabetically by jurisdiction)
  4. Foundation documents of the United Nations, the League of Nations and the European Union (in that order). Constitutions of the same jurisdiction are cited in reverse chronological order.
2. Statutes
  1. Federal: Statutes in U.S.C., U.S.C.A., or U.S.C.S.; other statutes currently in force, by reverse chronological order of enactment; rules of evidence and procedure and repealed statutes (by reverse chronological order of enactment)
  2. State (alphabetically by state): Statutes in the current code, by order in the code; statutes in force but not in the current code, by order in the code; rules of evidence and procedure, and repealed statutes (by reverse chronological order of enactment)
  3. Foreign (alphabetically by jurisdiction): Codes or statutes in the current code, by order in the code; statutes in force but not in the current code, by reverse chronological order of enactment, and repealed statutes (by reverse chronological order of enactment)
  4. Treaties and other international agreements, other than the foundation documents of the UN, League of Nations, and the EU: cite in reverse chronological order.
3. Cases: Cases decided by the same court are arranged in reverse chronological order; all U.S. circuit courts of appeals are treated as one court, and all federal district courts are treated as one court. Cite cases in the following order, in the order of federal, state, foreign, and international:
  1. Federal:
    1. Supreme Court
    2. Court of Appeals, Emergency Court of Appeals and Temporary Emergency Court of Appeals
    3. Court of Claims, Court of Customs and Patent Appeals and bankruptcy appeals panels
    4. District courts, Judicial Panel on Multidistrict Litigation and Court of International Trade
    5. District bankruptcy courts and the Railroad Reorganization Court
    6. Court of Federal Claims, Court of Appeals for the Armed Forces, and Tax Court
    7. Administrative agencies, alphabetically by agency
  2. State
    1. Courts, alphabetically by state and then by rank within each state
    2. Agencies, alphabetically by state and then alphabetically by agency within states
  3. Foreign
    1. Courts, alphabetically by jurisdiction and then by rank within each jurisdiction
    2. Agencies, alphabetically by jurisdiction and then alphabetically by agency within each jurisdiction
  4. International
    1. International Court of Justice, Permanent Court of International Justice
    2. Other international tribunals and arbitration panels, alphabetically by name
4. Legislative materials: Cite in the following order: bills and resolutions, committee hearings, reports, documents, and committee prints, floor debates (in reverse chronological order)
5. Administrative and executive materials: Cite in the following order: federal (Executive Orders, current Treasury Regulations, other regulations in force, proposed rules not in force, repealed materials), state (alphabetically by state) and foreign (alphabetically by jurisdiction)
6. Resolutions, decisions, and regulations of intergovernmental organizations: Cite in the following order: UN and League of Nations (General Assembly, then Security Council, then other organs in alphabetical order) and other organizations (alphabetically by name of organization)
7. Records, briefs, and petitions, cited in that order
8. Secondary materials: Cite in the following order: uniform codes, model codes and restatements (in reverse chronological order by category); books and pamphlets, works in journals, book reviews not written by students, student-written law-review materials, annotations, magazine and newspaper articles, working papers, unpublished materials and electronic sources (including Internet sources). For all secondary sources except codes and restatements, cite alphabetically by last name of author; if none, by first word of title.
9. Cross-references to the author's own material in text or footnotes; for example:
  See Arnold v. Runnels, 421 F.3d 859, 866 n. 8 (9th Cir.2005); United States v. Soliz, 129 F.3d 499, 504 n. 3 (1997), overruled on other grounds by United States v. Johnson, 256 F.3d 895 (9th Cir.2001) (en banc) (per curiam); Evans v. Demosthenes, 98 F.3d 1174, 1176 (9th Cir.1996).

=== Parenthetical information ===
Parentheticals, as needed, explain the relevance of an authority to the proposition in the text. Parenthetical information is recommended when the relevance of a cited authority might not otherwise be clear to the reader. Explanatory information takes the form of a present-participle phrase, a quoted sentence or a short statement appropriate in context. Unlike the other signals, it immediately follows the full citation. Usually brief (about one sentence), it quickly explains how the citation supports or disagrees with the proposition. For example:

Brown v. Board of Education, 347 U.S. 483 (1954) (overruling Plessy v. Ferguson, 163 U.S. 537 (1896)).

=== Phrases not quoting an authority ===
Explanatory parenthetical phrases not directly quoting the authority usually begin with a present participle and should not begin with a capital letter:

See generally John Copeland Nagle & J.B. Ruhl, The Law of Biodiversity and Ecosystem Management 227-45 (2002) (detailing the ESA's prohibition on the possession of protected species).

When a complete participial phrase is unnecessary in context, a shorter parenthetical may be substituted:

Such standards have been adopted to address a variety of environmental problems. See, e.g., H.B. Jacobini, The New International Sanitary Regulations, 46 Am. J. INT'L L. 727, 727-28(1952) (health-related water quality); Robert L. Meyer, Travaux Preparatoires for the UNESCO World Heritage Convention, 2 EARTH L.J. 45, 45-81 (1976)(conservation of protected areas).

=== Phrases quoting an authority ===
If the parenthetical quotes one or more full sentences, it begins with a capital letter and ends with punctuation:

See Committee Note to Interim Rule 8001(f) ("Given the short time limit to file the petition with the circuit clerk, subdivision (f)(1) provides that entry of a certification on the docket does not occur until an effective appeal is taken under Rule 8003(a) or (b).").

Insert a space before the opening parenthesis of the explanatory parenthetical. If the parenthetical does not contain a complete sentence, the writer should not place final punctuation (such as a period) inside it.

Place a parenthetical included as part of a citation before an explanatory parenthetical:

Fed. R. Civ. P. 30(1) (emphasis added) (also indicating that "[a] party may instruct a deponent not to answer . . . when necessary to preserve a privilege").

Shorter parenthetical phrases may be used if a complete participial phrase is unnecessary in the context of the citation:

The Florida Supreme court recently declared that "where the seller of a home knows facts materially affecting the value of the property which are not readily observable and are not known to the buyer, the seller is under a duty to disclose them to the buyer." Johnson v. Davis, 480 So. 2d 625, 629 (Fla. 1985) (defective roof in three-year-old home).

If a source directly quotes or supports an argument (no signal or "see" before a citation), no parenthetical is necessary.

=== Order in a citation ===
If a cited case has subsequent history or other relevant authority, it follows the parenthetical:

Anderson v. Terhune, 467 F.3d 1208 (9th Cir.2006) (claiming that a police officer's continued questioning violated due process rights), rehearing en banc granted, 486 F.3d 1115 (9th Cir.2007).

=== Internal cross-references ===
Portions of text, footnotes, and groups of authorities within the piece are cited with supra or infra. Supra refers to material already in the piece, and infra to material appearing later in the piece. "Note" and "Part" refer to footnotes and parts (when parts are specifically designed) in the same piece; "p." and "pp." are used to refer to other pages in the same piece. These abbreviations should be used sparingly to avoid repeating a lengthy footnote or to cross-reference a nearby footnote.

== See also ==
- Oxford Standard for Citation of Legal Authorities (OSCOLA)
