= Fascist culture =

Culture associated with fascism

Fascist culture refers to culture promoted by fascist movements and governments. Fascism placed a large emphasis on aesthetics and presentation, using myths, symbols, and spectacle to mobilise mass support. Multiple scholars point to the aestheticisation of politics as a defining feature of fascist regimes. In practice, fascist governments in Italy and Germany exercised control over media and arts, using cultural institutions to promote the ideology of the state and suppress dissent.

== Aesthetics ==
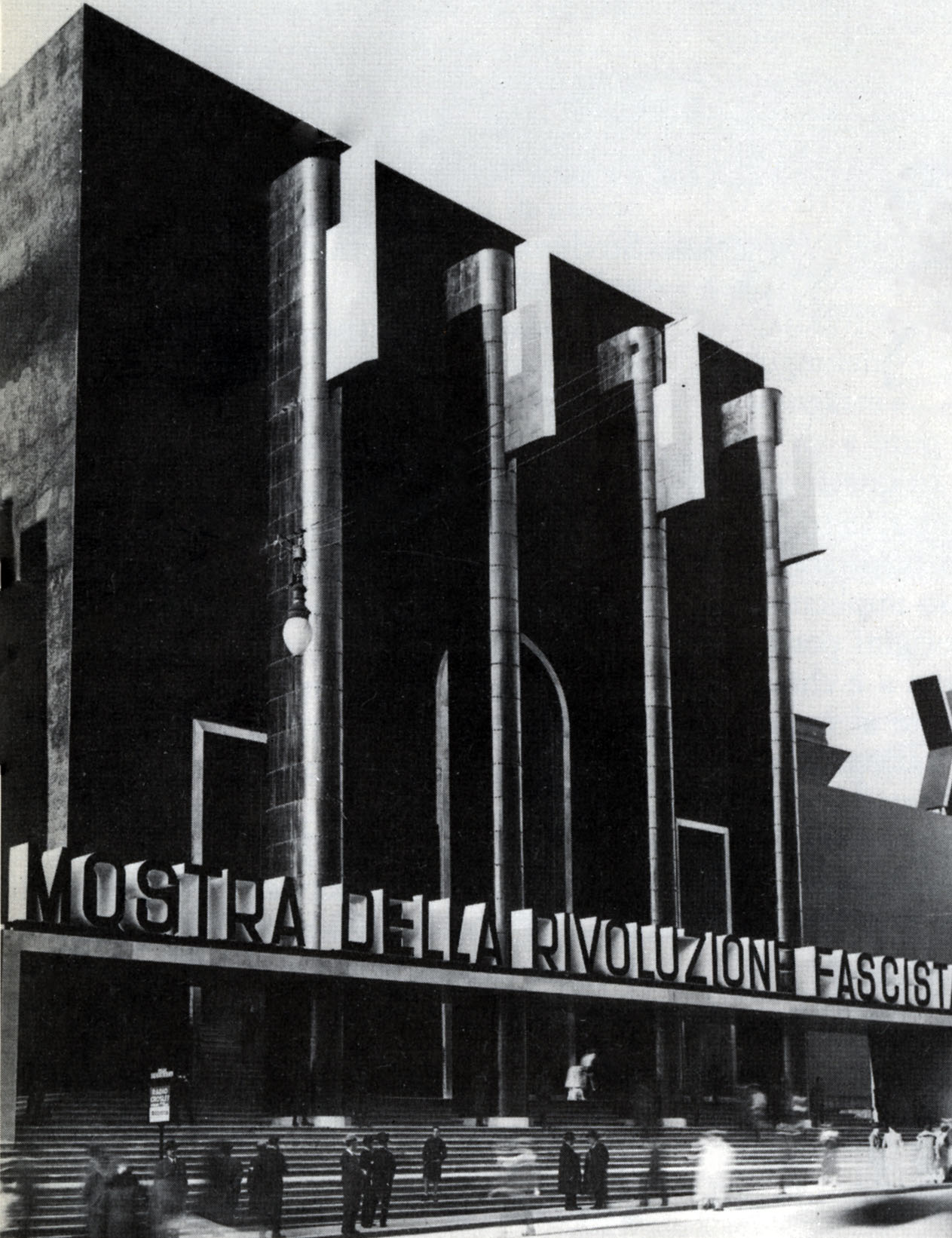
The 1932 Exhibition of the Fascist Revolution in Rome combined stylized depictions of four fasces with a modernist architectural design.

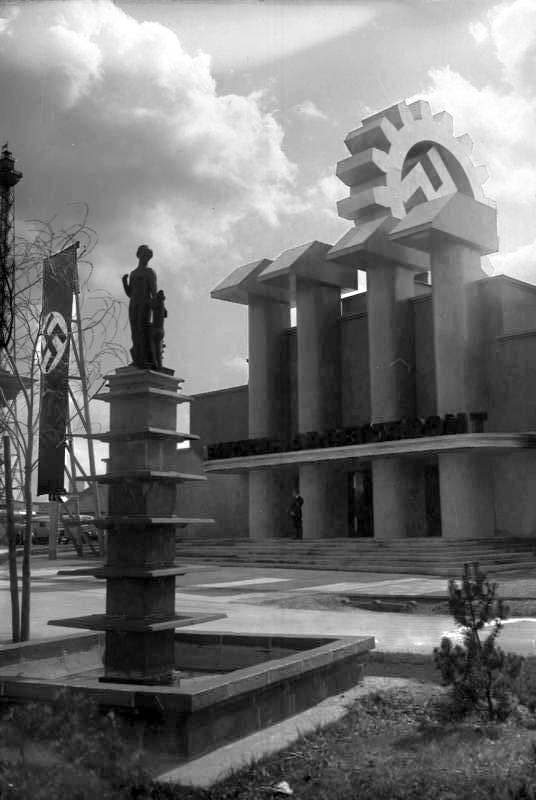
An example of architecture in Nazi Germany mixing modernist design with the swastika symbol

In The Work of Art in the Age of Mechanical Reproduction (1935), Walter Benjamin identifies aestheticisation of politics as a key ingredient in fascist regimes. On this point he quotes Filippo Tommaso Marinetti, founder of the Futurist art movement and co-author of the Fascist Manifesto (1919), who aestheticises war in his writings and claims "war is beautiful".

In Simulacra and Simulation (1981), Jean Baudrillard interprets fascism as a "political aesthetic of death" and a vehement countermovement against the increasing rationalism, secularism, and pacifism of the modern Western world.

The standard definition of fascism, given by Stanley G. Payne, focuses on three concepts, one of which is a "fascist style" with an aesthetic structure of meetings, symbols, and political liturgy, stressing emotional and mystical aspects.

Emilio Gentile argues that fascism expresses itself aesthetically more than theoretically by means of a new political style with myths, rites, and symbols as a lay religion which was designed to acculturate, socialize, and integrate the faith of the masses. The goal of the process was the creation a "new man".

Cultural critic Susan Sontag writes:

Fascist aesthetics ... flow from (and justify) a preoccupation with situations of control, submissive behavior, extravagant effort, and the endurance of pain; they endorse two seemingly opposite states, egomania and servitude. The relations of domination and enslavement take the form of a characteristic pageantry: the massing of groups of people; the turning of people into things; the multiplication or replication of things; and the grouping of people/things around an all-powerful, hypnotic leader-figure or force. The fascist dramaturgy centers on the orgiastic transactions between mighty forces and their puppets, uniformly garbed and shown in ever swelling numbers. Its choreography alternates between ceaseless motion and a congealed, static, 'virile' posing. Fascist art glorifies surrender, it exalts mindlessness, it glamorizes death.

Sontag also enumerates some commonalities between fascist art and the official art of communist countries, such as the obeisance of the masses to the hero, and a preference for the monumental and the "grandiose and rigid" choreography of mass bodies. But whereas official communist art "aims to expound and reinforce a utopian morality", the art of fascist countries such as Nazi Germany "displays a utopian aesthetics – that of physical perfection", in a way that is "both prurient and idealizing".

According to Sontag, fascist aesthetics "is based on the containment of vital forces; movements are confined, held tight, held in". Its appeal is not necessarily limited to those who share the fascist political ideology because fascism "stands for an ideal or rather ideals that are persistent today under the other banners: the ideal of life as art, the cult of beauty, the fetishism of courage, the dissolution of alienation in ecstatic feelings of community; the repudiation of the intellect; the family of man (under the parenthood of leaders)."

== Popular culture ==
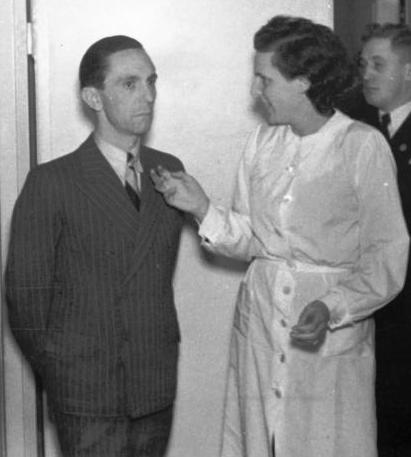
Joseph Goebbels with film director Leni Riefenstahl in 1937

In Italy, the Mussolini regime created the Direzione Generale per la Cinematografi to encourage film studios to glorify fascism. Italian cinema flourished because the regime stopped the import of Hollywood films in 1938, subsidized domestic production, and kept ticket prices low. It encouraged international distribution to glorify its African empire and to oppose the accusation that Italy was backward. The regime censored criticism and used the state-run Luce Institute film company to laud the Duce through newsreels, documentaries, and photographs. The regime promoted Italian opera and theatre as well, making sure that political enemies did not have a voice on stage.

In Nazi Germany, the new Reich Chamber of Culture was placed under the control of Joseph Goebbels, Hitler's powerful Reich Minister for Public Enlightenment and Propaganda. The goal was to stimulate the Aryanization of German culture and to prohibit postmodern trends such as surrealism and cubism.

== Futurism ==
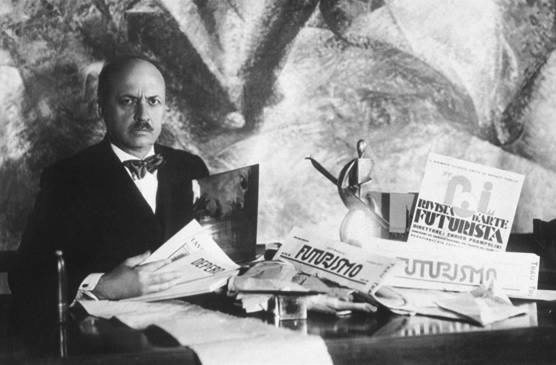
Filippo Tommaso Marinetti, author of the Futurist Manifesto (1908) and later the co-author of the Fascist Manifesto (1919)

Radical nationalism in Italy – support for expansionism and cultural revolution to create a "New Man" and a "New State" – began to grow in 1912 during the Italian conquest of Libya and was supported by Italian Futurists and by members of the Italian Nationalist Association (ANI). Futurism was both an artistic-cultural movement and initially a political movement in Italy led by Filippo Tommaso Marinetti, the author of the Futurist Manifesto (1908), that championed the causes of modernism, action and political violence as necessary elements of politics while denouncing liberalism and parliamentary politics. Marinetti rejected conventional democracy as based on majority rule and egalitarianism, while promoting a new form of democracy, which he described in his work "The Futurist Conception of Democracy" as the following: "We are therefore able to give the directions to create and to dismantle to numbers, to quantity, to the mass, for with us number, quantity and mass will never be – as they are in Germany and Russia – the number, quantity and mass of mediocre men, incapable and indecisive". The ANI claimed that liberal democracy was no longer compatible with the modern world and advocated a strong state and imperialism, claiming that humans are naturally predatory and that nations were in a constant struggle, in which only the strongest nations could survive.

== See also ==
- Fascism
- Fascist architecture
- Fascist symbolism
- Nazi architecture
- Nazi symbolism
- Propaganda in Fascist Italy
- Propaganda in Nazi Germany

== Bibliography ==
=== Secondary sources ===
- Barr, Alfred H. Jr (1966) [1936]. Cubism and Abstract Art. The Museum of Modern Art, Arno Press.
- Baudrillard, Jean (1994) [1981]. Simulacra and Simulation. Ann Arbor: University of Michigan Press. ISBN 978-0-472-06521-9.
- Ben-Ghiat, Ruth (2015). "The Imperial Moment in Fascist Cinema". Journal of Modern European History. 13 (1): 59–78. doi:10.17104/1611-8944_2015_1_59. S2CID 147023860.
- Berezin, Mabel (1991). "The organization of political ideology: Culture, state, and theater in fascist Italy". American Sociological Review. 56 (5): 639–651. doi:10.2307/2096085. JSTOR 2096085.
- Benjamin, Walter (2008) [1935]. The Work of Art in the Age of Mechanical Reproduction. London: Penguin Books. ISBN 978-0-14-103619-9.
- Gentile, Emilo (2003). The Struggle for Modernity: Nationalism, Futurism, and Fascism. Praeger Publishers. ISBN 978-0-275-97692-7.
- Hewitt, Andrew (1993). Fascist modernism: aesthetics, politics, and the avant-garde. Stanford: Stanford University Press.
- "How Cinecittà's Advanced Facilities Made History in Italian Cinema". The Italian Tribune. 5 July 2018. Archived from the original on 7 October 2025.
- Jay, Martin (1992). "'The Aesthetic Ideology' as Ideology; Or, What Does It Mean to Aestheticize Politics?". Cultural Critique (21). University of Minnesota Press: 41–61. doi:10.2307/1354116. JSTOR 1354116.
- Overy, Richard (2005). The Dictators: Hitler's Germany, Stalin's Russia. Penguin. ISBN 978-0140281491.
- Payne, Stanley G. (1980). Fascism: Comparison and Definition. University of Wisconsin Press. ISBN 978-0-299-08060-0.
- ——— (1995). A History of Fascism, 1914–45. Madison, WI: University of Wisconsin Press. ISBN 978-0-299-14874-4. online; also another copy.
- Sontag, Susan (6 February 1975). "Fascinating Fascism". The New York Review of Books. Archived from the original on 18 July 2020 – via Google Books.
- Sorlin, Pierre (2007). "A Mirror for Fascism. How Mussolini Used Cinema to Advertise his Person and Regime". Historical Journal of Film, Radio and Television. 27 (1): 111–117. doi:10.1080/01439680601177163. S2CID 192025081.
- Steinweis, Alan E. (1996). Art, ideology, & economics in Nazi Germany: the Reich chambers of music, theater, and the visual arts. University of North Carolina Press.
