= Aestheticization =

Aestheticization or Aestheticisation can refer to:

- Aestheticization of politics
- Aestheticization of violence
