= ALWD =

ALWD may refer to:

- Association of Legal Writing Directors
- ALWD Guide to Legal Citation, formerly ALWD Citation Manual, compiled by the Association of Legal Writing Directors
