= Maroonbook =

System of legal citation

The Maroonbook is a system of legal citation that intends to be simpler and more straightforward than the more widely used Bluebook. It was developed at the University of Chicago, and is the citation system for the University of Chicago Law Review. As a simplified and modernized citation method, it tends to be closer to the Oxford Standard for Citation of Legal Authorities in its conventions.

== Conventions ==
The Maroonbook gives the following examples:

(1) Case names

- See Ferdinand v. Isabella, 14 US 92, 96–98 (1492).

(2) Titles of periodical articles and articles in edited books

- Eppard Richstein, Elements of Liberty, 21 U Chi L Rev 45, 60 (1954).

(3) Book and treatise titles

- Friedrich W. Nietzsche, On Truth and Lie in an Extramoral Sense 365 (Oxford 1957) (Edith P. Honeywell, trans).

== See also ==
- OSCOLA
- Bluebook
- ALWD Guide to Legal Citation
- The Indigo Book
