= The Indigo Book =

Style guide for legal citation

Cover

The Indigo Book: An Open and Compatible Implementation of A Uniform System of Citation (formerly Baby Blue's Manual of Legal Citation) is a free content version of the Bluebook system of legal citation. Founded by New York University professor Christopher Jon Sprigman, authored collectively by Sprigman and a group of NYU law students, and published by Public.Resource.Org, it is an adaptation based on the 10th edition of the Bluebook as published by the Harvard Law Review Association in 1958, which had entered the public domain in the United States because its copyright had expired due to non-renewal.

The project was inspired by correspondence between Public.Resource.Org's founder Carl Malamud and a Nagoya University academic, who was threatened by lawyers representing the HLRA over plans to incorporate the Bluebook system into the open source citation management program Zotero. Sprigman has argued that the system of citation expressed in the Bluebook was effectively public domain because its mandated usage in courts made it an "edict of government", and because, barring trivial changes, the then-current 19th edition was nearly identical to the public domain 10th edition. Sprigman stated that the project's main goal was to allow the Bluebook's system of citation to be widely available at no cost, and allow others to collaborate on it under an open-source model.

The Indigo Book is an unofficial substitute to the official Bluebook and is not endorsed by the Harvard Law Review Association; in December 2015, the project faced legal threats over its original name, Baby Blue's, which lawyers representing the HLRA felt was too similar to the Bluebook trademark. These threats led to the renaming of the guide to The Indigo Book in March 2016.

== History ==
Nagoya University Graduate School of Law academic Frank Bennett had wished to include support for the Bluebook—a widely used system of legal citations, into the open source citation management software Zotero. However, lawyers representing the Harvard Law Review Association, who publishes the Bluebook, asserted that the Bluebook's inclusion of "carefully curated examples, explanations and other textual materials" made it a copyrighted work. Carl Malamud, head of the organization Public.Resource.Org, was informed by Bennett about the refusals. New York University School of Law professor Christopher Jon Sprigman caught wind of Malamud's correspondence; he had argued that the system of citation expressed in the Bluebook was in the public domain because its widely mandated use in the court system made it an edict of government, going on to state that "in this case, a copyright is being used to keep something private that we all have to use." Additionally, U.S. copyright law states that a "system" is ineligible for copyright protection.

Research conducted by Malamud and Sprigman found that the 10th edition of the Bluebook, published in 1958, had fallen into the public domain because its copyright had not been renewed, as required by U.S. law at the time. On October 6, 2014, Sprigman sent a letter of response to the Harvard Law Review Association, disclosing these findings and arguing that the content of the then-current 19th edition was nearly identical to the 10th barring trivial changes. Thus, he also announced an intent to publish a free-content version of the Bluebook known as Baby Blue, which would be adapted from the public domain text of the 10th edition with "newly-created material that implements the Bluebook's system of citation in a fully usable form."

Sprigman explained that "every person, including every poor person, should be able to cite the law. Imprisoned litigants, pro se litigants, legal clinics, small law firms and solo practitioners — all of them need better access to our system of legal citation if the law is to work for them and for their clients. And that means free access." Sprigman also stated that the use of an open-source development model and licensing would allow others to contribute to and help improve the system; he argued that the Bluebook in its current form was "over-prescriptive and rigid" and "a barrier to entry to our legal system", going on to ask, "what other standard of this importance to the American public would be entrusted to a group so small, unrepresentative, closed to input, and beyond both supervision and discipline?"

=== Trademark issues ===
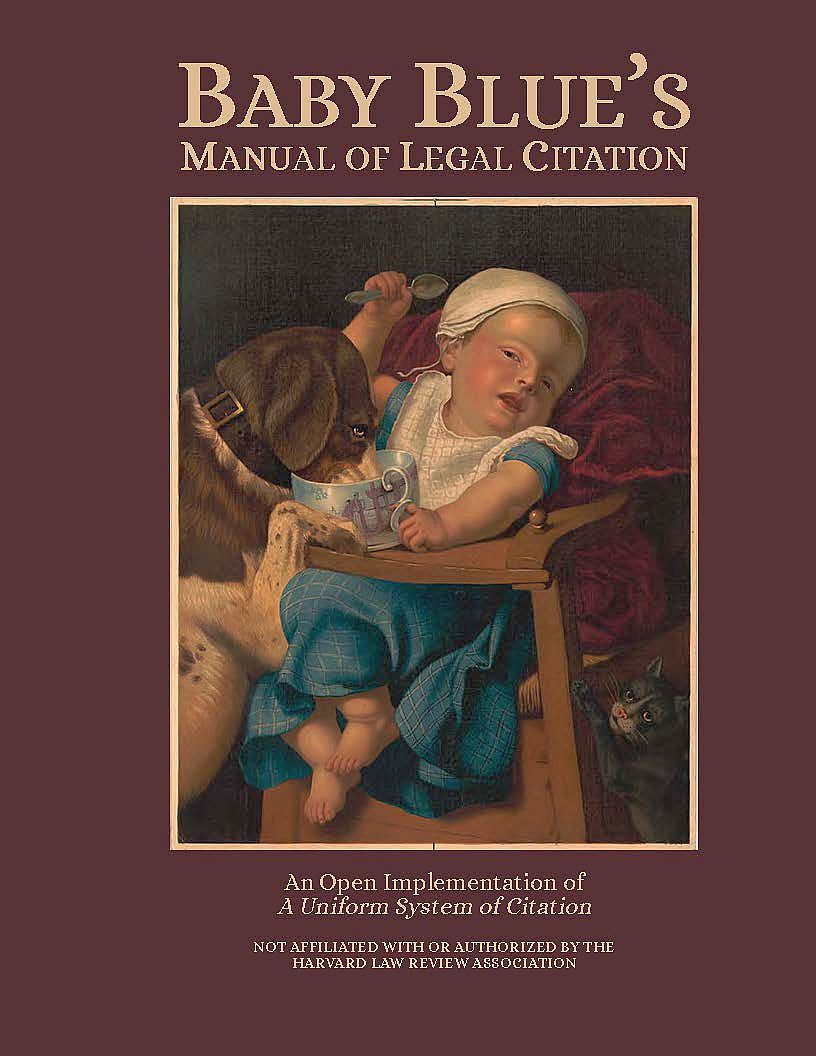
The original Baby Blue title was the subject of legal threats due to its similarities to that of Bluebook.

In December 2015, following Twitter postings by Malamud teasing the upcoming release of Baby Blue, the Harvard Law Review Association threatened legal action against the project, as it believed that the name Baby Blue had a confusing similarity to the "Bluebook" trademark, and requested a copy of the publication to perform intellectual property examinations under a presumption that it may be substantially similar to the copyrighted work. Sprigman objected to the trademark claims, feeling that "the idea they own the name 'blue' for a manual for legal citations is ridiculous." Following the threats, a group of over 120 Yale Law School students issued a letter in support of the Baby Blue project. In response to the trademark concerns, the name of the guide was changed to The Indigo Book on March 31, 2016.

== See also ==
- Case citation
- Maroonbook
- ALWD Citation Manual
