= The University of Chicago Law Review =

- Discipline: Law review
- Language: English
- Edited by: Miranda Coombe

Publication details
- History: 1933–present
- Publisher: University of Chicago Law School (United States)
- Frequency: 8/year
- Impact factor: 2.284 (2016)

Standard abbreviations
- Bluebook: U. Chi. L. Rev.
- ISO 4: Univ. Chic. Law Rev.

Indexing
- CODEN: UCLRA2
- ISSN: 0041-9494 (print); 1939-859X (web)
- LCCN: 36031425
- JSTOR: 00419494
- OCLC no.: 02123921

Links
- Journal homepage; Chicago Unbound (repository)

The University of Chicago Law Review (Maroonbook abbreviation: U Chi L Rev) is the flagship law journal published by the University of Chicago Law School. It utilizes a different citation system than most law journals—the Maroonbook rather than the Bluebook. It is published eight times per year in print and also has an online companion, The University of Chicago Law Review Online.

== History ==
The Law Review was established in 1933. From 1942 through 1945 the review was published by the faculty, due to declining student enrollment at the law school during World War II. Prominent former student members have included Judge Abner J. Mikva, Ohio Attorney General Richard Cordray, Princeton University president Christopher L. Eisgruber, religious leader Dallin H. Oaks, and professor Geoffrey R. Stone (all editors-in-chief); Judges Danny Boggs, Robert Bork, Frank H. Easterbrook, Douglas H. Ginsburg, and David Tatel; professors Marvin Chirelstein, Daniel Fischel, Lawrence M. Friedman, Mary Ann Glendon, and Michael W. McConnell; and co-founder of The Carlyle Group, David M. Rubenstein.

== Content ==
The Law Review is edited by student journal members, which are University of Chicago Law School students selected on the basis of their grades or performance on a writing assignment after the first year. It publishes articles written by scholars and lawyers from around the world, and student articles, or "Comments." Prominent legal figures who have published in the journal include U.S. Supreme Court justices William J. Brennan Jr., Tom C. Clark, William O. Douglas, Felix Frankfurter, Antonin Scalia, and John Paul Stevens; Judges David L. Bazelon, Charles D. Breitel, Guido Calabresi, Henry Friendly, Richard Posner, Patricia Wald, Jack B. Weinstein, and Ralph K. Winter; Justice Roger Traynor of the California Supreme Court; and professors Bruce Ackerman, Ronald Dworkin, H. L. A. Hart, Karl Llewellyn, John Rawls, John Henry Wigmore, Samuel Williston, and Brainerd Currie; and J. Edgar Hoover.

== Rankings ==
Among United States law journals in 2023, CLR is ranked 12th by Washington and Lee University Law School and eighth by a professor at the University of Oregon School of Journalism and Communication.

In 2020, it was rated as among the top five most cited law reviews in the world by TaxProf blog.

According to the Journal Citation Reports, the journal has a 2016 impact factor of 2.284.
