= Authenticity in art =

Concept concerning the genuineness and originality of artworks

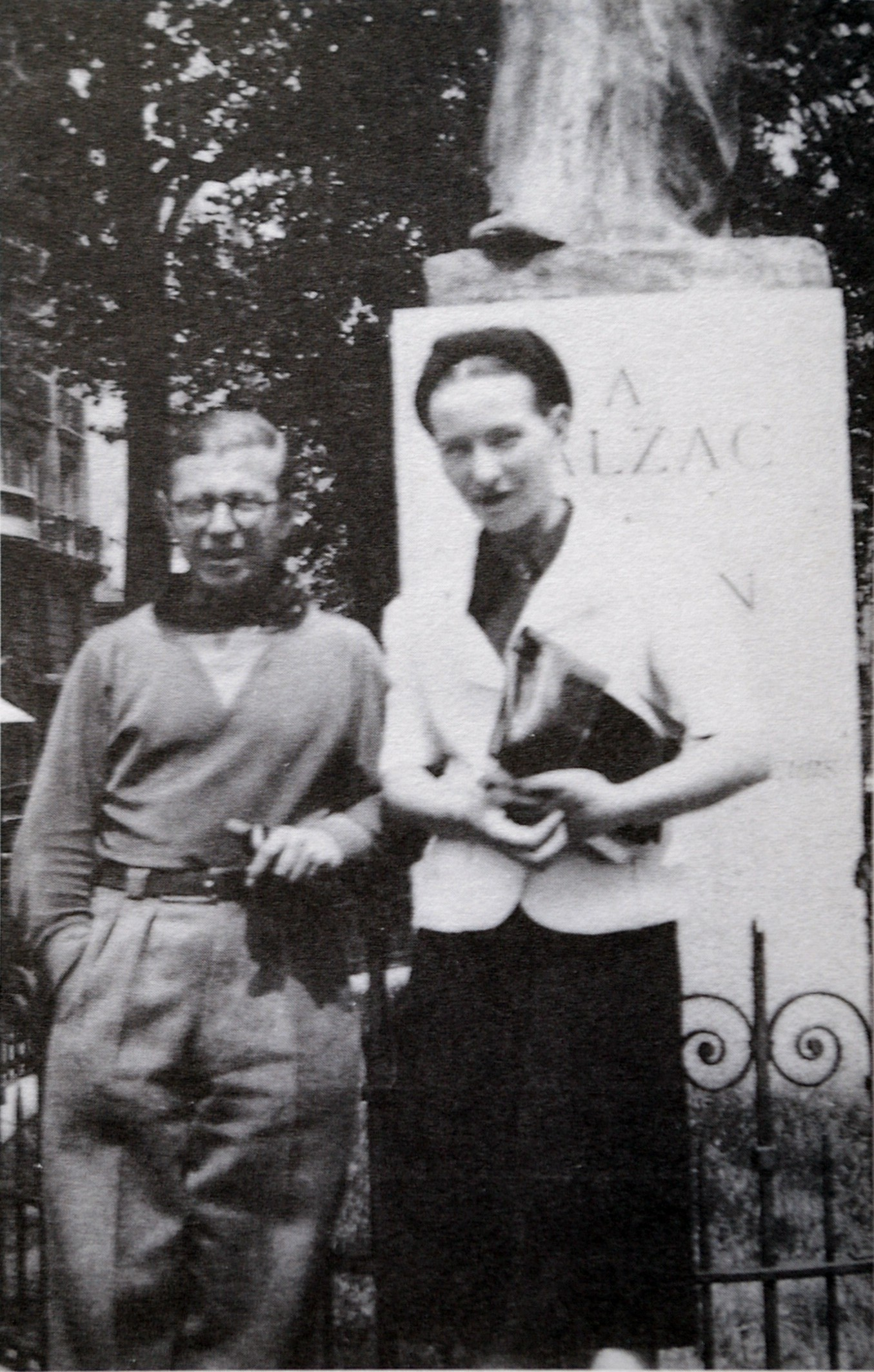
The philosophers of authenticity: Jean-Paul Sartre and Simone de Beauvoir at the memorial to Honoré de Balzac.

Authenticity in art is manifested in the different ways that a work of art, or an artistic performance, can be considered authentic. The initial distinction is between nominal authenticity and expressive authenticity. In the first sense, nominal authenticity is the correct identification of the author of a work of art; of how closely an actor or an actress interprets a role in a stageplay as written by the playwright; of how well a musician's performance of an artistic composition corresponds to the composer's intention; and how closely an objet d’art conforms to the artistic traditions of its genre. In the second sense, expressive authenticity is how much the work of art possesses inherent authority of and about its subject, and how much of the artist's intent is in the work of art.

For the spectator, the listener, and the viewer, the authenticity of experience is an emotion impossible to recapture beyond the first encounter with the work of art in its original setting. In the cases of sculpture and of painting, the contemporary visitor to a museum encounters the work of art displayed in a simulacrum of the original setting for which the artist created the art. To that end, the museum visitor will see a curated presentation of the work of art as an objet d’art, and might not perceive the aesthetic experience inherent to observing the work of art in its original setting — the intent of the artist.

Artistic authenticity is a requirement for the inscription of an artwork to the World Heritage List of the Educational, Scientific, and Cultural Organisation of the United Nations (UNESCO); the Nara Document on Authenticity (1994) stipulates that artistic authenticity can be expressed through the form and design; the materials and substance; the use and function; the traditions and techniques; the location and setting; and the spirit and feeling of the given work of art.

== Nominal authenticity ==
=== Provenance ===
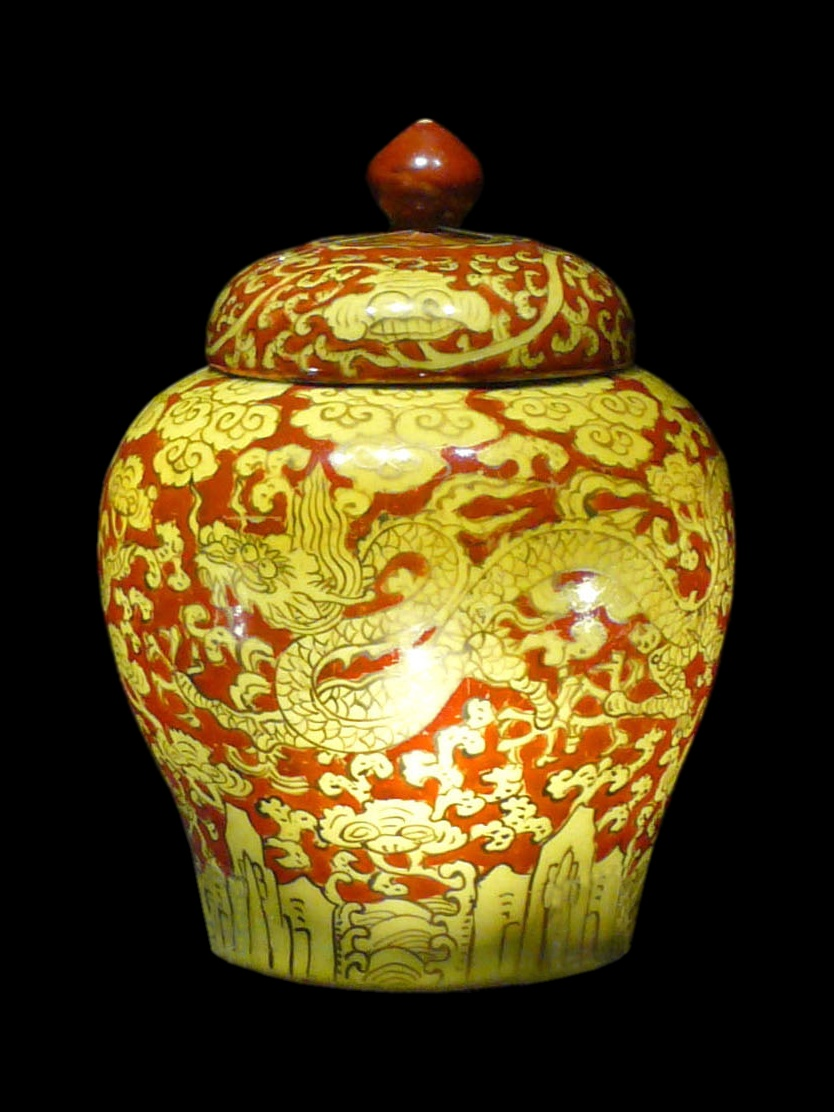
Authenticity of provenance: The Yellow Dragon jar from the Jiajing period (1521–1567) of the Ming dynasty (1368–1644); a practical item in the 16th-century, and an objet d’art in the 21st century.

The authenticity of provenance of an objet d’art is the positive identification of the artist and the place and time of the artwork's origin; thus, art experts determine authenticity of provenance with four tests: (i) verification of the artist's signature on the work of art; (ii) a review of the historical documentation attesting to the history of the artefact; (iii) scientific evidence (x-rays of the canvas, infrared spectroscopy of the paint, dendrochronological analysis of the wood); and (iv) the expert judgement of a connoisseur with a trained eye.

In Sincerity and Authenticity (1972), the literary critic Lionel Trilling said that the question of authenticity of provenance had acquired a profoundly moral dimension, that regardless of the physical condition and appearance, or the quality of workmanship of an artwork, it is greatly important to know whether or not a Ming vase is authentic or a clever art forgery. The preoccupation with the authenticity of provenance of an artwork is historically recent, and particular to Western materialism; in the Eastern world, it is the work of art, itself, which is important; the artist's identity and the provenance of the artwork are secondary considerations.

=== Art forgery ===
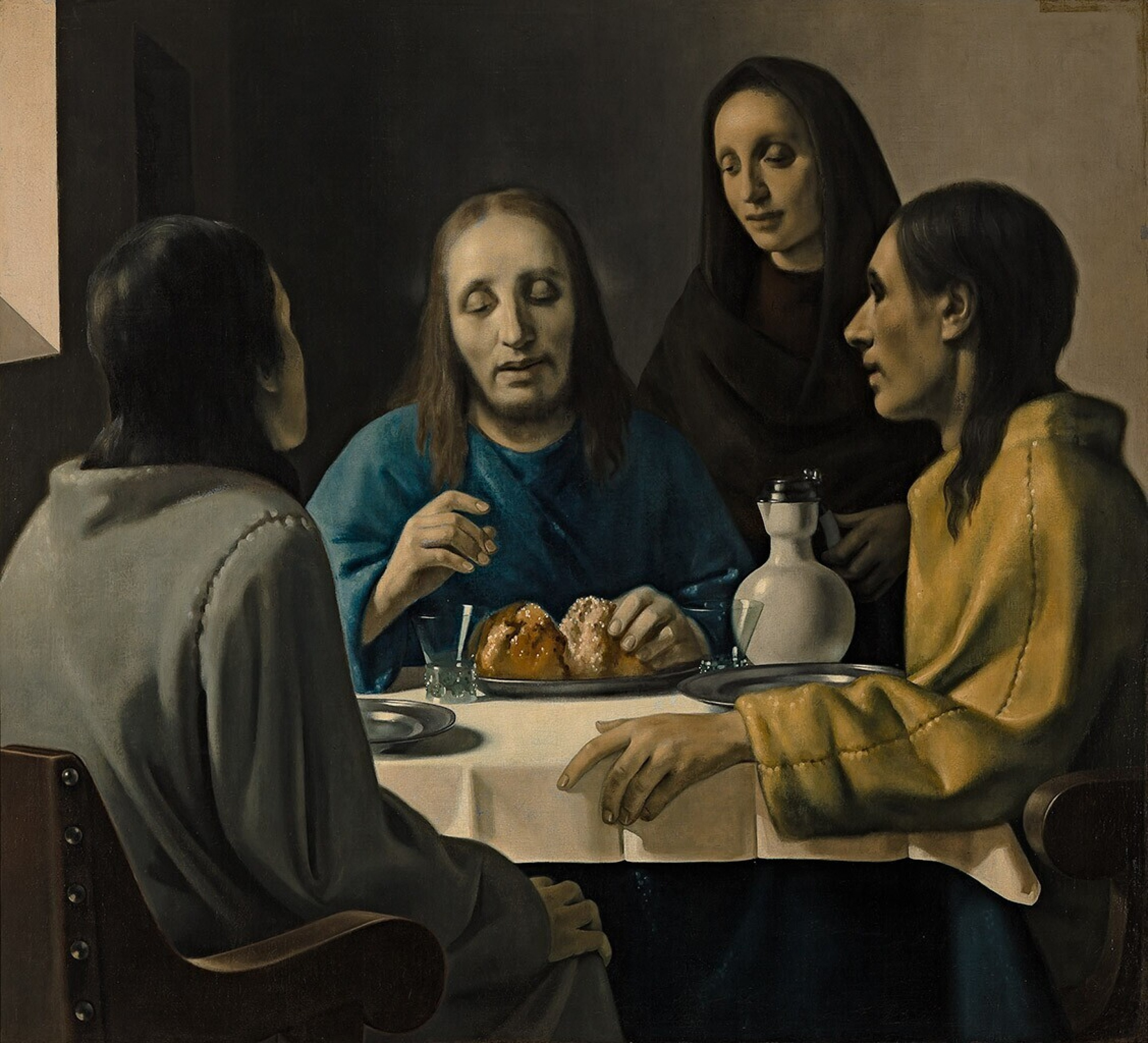
The art of forgery: The Supper at Emmaus (1937), by Han van Meegeren, a Dutch master forger who deceived the Nazi leader H. Göring into believing that the painting was a genuine Vermeer.

Consequent to a critically truncated career, the painter Han van Meegeren (1889–1947) earned his living as an art forger, by specifically producing fake paintings of 17th-century artists, such as Frans Hals (1582–1666) and Pieter de Hooch (1629–1684), Gerard ter Borch (1617–1681) and Johannes Vermeer (1632–1675). Van Meegeren produced masterful paintings that deceived critics and art experts, who then accepted and acclaimed the forgeries as genuine masterpieces, especially the Supper at Emmaus (1937) painting accepted as a real Vermeer by experts, such as Abraham Bredius.

To survive the Second World War (1939–1945), van Meegeren sold forgeries to the Nazi occupiers of the Netherlands (1940–1945). In the post–war reckoning among the nations, the Dutch authorities arrested van Meegeren as a Nazi collaborator who had sold national treasures to the German enemy. To avoid a traitor's death, van Meegeren demonstrated his technical skills as a forger of paintings by the Old Masters, to prove he sold forged paintings to the Nazis.

To guard against unwittingly buying a forged work of art, sellers and buyers use a certificate of authenticity as documentary proof that an artwork is the genuine creation of the artist identified as the author of the work — yet there is much business in counterfeit certificates of authenticity, which determines the monetary value of a work of art. The inauthenticity of forged painting is discovered with documentary evidence from art history and with forensic evidence gleaned from the techniques of art conservation, such as chronological dating, to establish the authenticity of provenance of paintings by the Old Masters. The potential monetary value represented by a certificate of authenticity can prejudice collectors and art dealers to buy recent-period artworks with determined provenance, sometimes established by the artist.

=== Forgery as art ===
Critical interest in a forgery as a work of art is rare; yet, in the essay "The Perfect Fake" (1961), the critic of architecture and art Aline B. Saarinen asked, "If a fake is so expert, that even after the most thorough and trustworthy examination, its authenticity is still open to doubt, is it or is it not as satisfactory a work of art as if it were unequivocally genuine?" In The Act of Creation (1964), Arthur Koestler concurred with Saarinen's proposition of "forgery as an art", and said that if a forgery fits into the body of work of an artist, and if the forgery produces the same aesthetic pleasure as the authentic artworks, then the forged art should be included to exhibitions of the works of the plagiarised artist.

In the art business, the artistic value of a well-executed forgery is irrelevant to a curator concerned with the authenticity of provenance of the original work of art — especially because formally establishing the provenance of a work of art is a question of possibility and probability, rarely of certainty, unless the artist vouches for the authenticity of the art. Nevertheless, to the arts community, a forgery remains a forgery, regardless of the excellent artistic execution of the forgery, itself; regardless of the artistic talent of the forger; and regardless of critical praise when critics and public believed the forgery was authentic art.

=== Mechanical reproduction ===
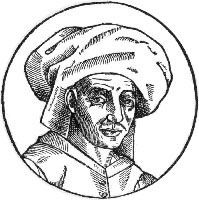
Mechanical reproduction of art: Facsimile of a 1611 woodcut of the Renaissance French composer Josquin des Prez (1450–1521) copied from an oil painting, the authentic work of art.

Relief printing is a form of mechanical reproduction of art; thus (i) an artist created a drawing; (ii) a craftsman used the drawing to create a woodcut block for relief-printing, usually destroying the original artwork when cutting the drawing into the block of wood; and (iii) the woodblock, itself, was discarded when worn-out for relief printing copies of the drawing. From that three-step process for the production of art, the printed copies of the original drawing are the final product of artistic creation, yet there exists no authentic work of art; the artistic copies have no authenticity of provenance.

In the essay "The Work of Art in the Age of Mechanical Reproduction" (1935), Walter Benjamin discussed the then-new visual media of photography and cinematography as machines capable of producing art that can be reproduced many times — yet no one version of the image is the original, artistically authentic image. As visual media that reproduce — but do not create — original images, photography and the cinema shift the concept of artistic authenticity from "art as ritual" to "art as politics" and so make works of art accessible to the mass population, rather than just the aficionado.

A contemporary extension of Benjamin's observations is the perpetual authenticity of the sculpture Sunbather (1971), by the artist Duane Hanson (1925–1996), who gave permission to the conservators of the life-sized sculpture (a woman sunbathing whilst reclining in a chaise longue) to replace parts of the sculpture (cap, swimming suit, towel, etc.) that became faded and worn. Likewise, in light of the artistic production and mechanical reproduction capabilities of computers and the internet, the media artist Julian H. Scaff said that the authenticity of provenance of a digital image (painting, still photograph, cinema frame) cannot be determined, because a digital work of art usually exists in more than one version, and each version is not created, but authored by a different digital artist with a different perspective of what is art.

== Authenticity of experience ==
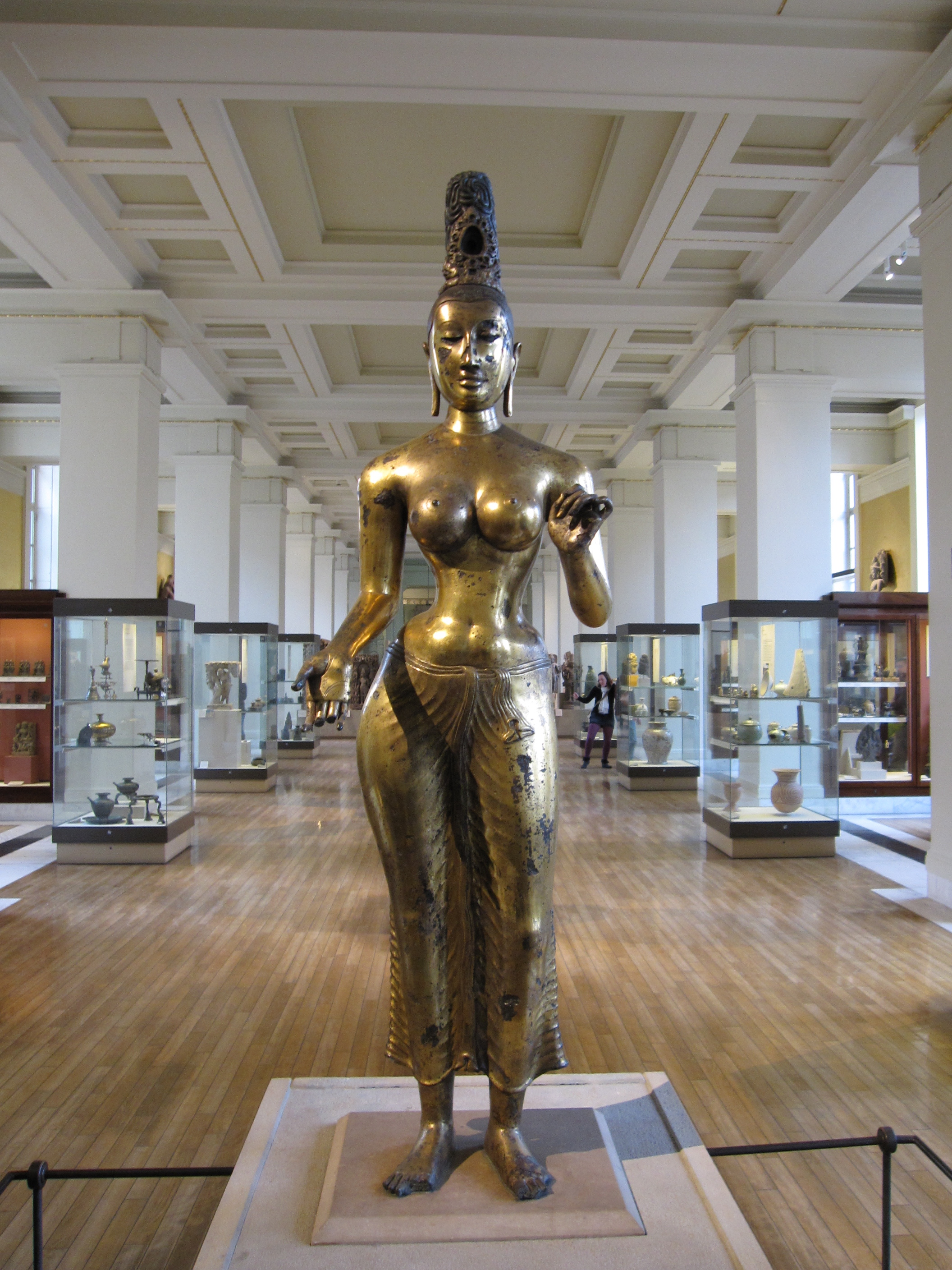
The authenticity of experience of a work of art is ephemeral; thus, beholding the statue of the Hindu goddess Tara (Sri Lanka, 8th c.) in a secular setting (a museum) is unlike the aesthetic experience of beholding the statue-as-goddess in the original setting (a temple).

Authenticity of experience is available only to the spectator who experiences a work of art in the original setting for which the artist created the artefact. In another setting, the authenticity of experience (purpose, time, place) is impossible; thus, in the Western world, the museum display is an approximation (literal, metaphoric) of the original setting for the which the artist created the work of art. Isolated exhibition in a museum diminishes the aesthetic experience of a work of art, although the spectator will see the work of art. Lacking the original context (place, time, purpose ) limits aesthetic appreciation than experience of the work of art in the original setting — where the art and the setting are the aesthetic intent of the artist.

Recognizing that authenticity of experience is unique and cannot be recaptured, the curator of a museum presents works of art in literal and metaphoric displays that approximate the original settings for which the artists created the artworks. Realised with artifice and lighting, the museum displays provide the spectator a sensory experience of the works of art. In that commercial vein, the tour business sells "the experience of art" as a facsimile of the authenticity of experience of art. The tourist consumes "Culture" by attending an opera at La Scala, an 18th-century opera house at Milan. The natural audience, informed opera aficionados, lose interest and cease attending regularly, but the opera house is a business, and continues presenting performances for aficionados of culture and for tourists with, perhaps, an understanding of the opera — the art being experienced. Likewise, to earn a living as artists, Pacific Islander dancers present their "Pacific Islander culture" as entertainment for and edification of tourists. Although the performances of Pacific-islander native culture might be nominally authentic art, in the sense of being true to the original culture, the authenticity of experience of the art is questionable.

== Cultural authenticity ==
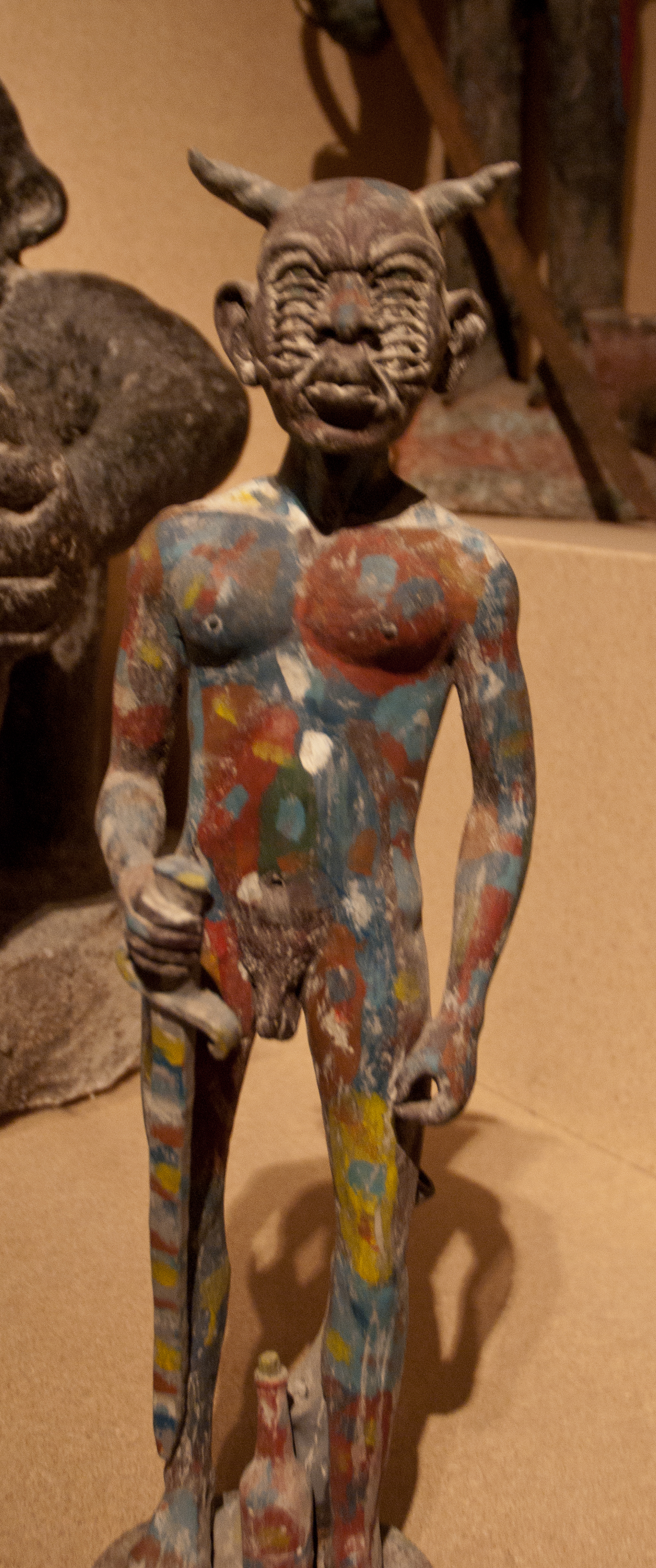
Cultural authenticity: A Haitian Vodou fetish statue of a devil with twelve eyes.

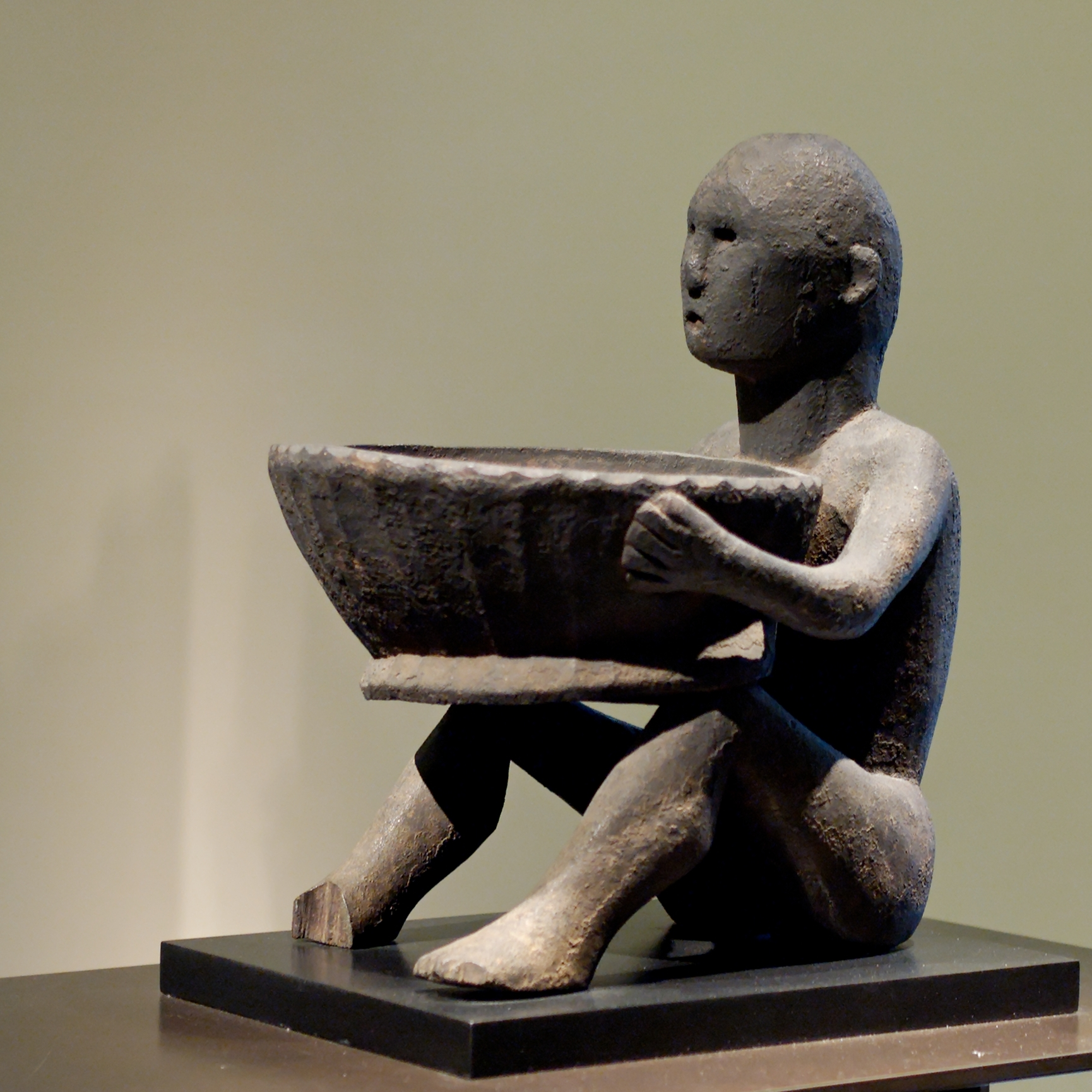
Cultural authenticity: A carved-wood bulul is a stylized representation of an ancestor that gains power from the presence of an ancestral spirit. Dating from the 15th century, bulul figurines guarded the community's rice crop, feature in traditional ceremonies, and are souvenirs sold to tourists to the Philippine Islands.

The authenticity of provenance establishes the material existence of the work of art; the identity of the artist; and when and where the artist created the work of art. Cultural authenticity — genre and artistic style — concerns whether or not a work of art is a genuine expression of artistic tradition. Concern with the cultural authenticity of a work of art usually originates from romanticism about the greater artistic value of artefacts created in "the pure tradition" of the genre; such an idealistic perspective usually derives from nationalism and racism and tribalism, and misunderstandings of aesthetics.

A work of art is authentic when executed in the style, with the materials, and by the production process that are essential attributes of the genre. Cultural authenticity derives from the artistic traditions created by the artists of the ethnic group. A genre artwork is authentic only if created by an artist from the ethnic group; therefore, only the Inuit can create authentic Inuit art. The philosophic and sociologic perspective of the authenticity of expression is what protects artists from the art thefts inherent and consequent to cultural appropriation; nonetheless, in the essay "Race, Ethnicity, Expressive Authenticity: Can White People Sing the Blues?" Joel Rudinow disagreed and defended cultural appropriation, and said that such protectiveness of cultural authenticity is a form of racism.

=== The art business ===
In the West, the market for "primitive art" arose and developed at the end of the 19th century, consequent to European explorers and colonialists meeting and trading with the cultural and ethnic groups of Africa, Asia, and Oceania. Artistically, the native peoples who dealt with the explorers and colonists quickly incorporated to their production of art new materials from Europe, such as cloth and glass beads. Yet European collectors and art dealers would not buy "inauthentic", mixed-media primitive art made with native and European materials. To overcome resistance to inauthentic primitive art, the art dealers produced artefacts, made with local materials, which Westerners would accept and buy as authentic native art.

The 19th-century business model of artistic production remains the contemporary practise in selling authentic objets d’art to Western collectors and aficionados. Usually, the artefacts are designed and modified to give the impression of possessing popular attributes and authentic provenance, such as religious-ritual use, antiquity, and association with aristocracy and royalty. In the 20th century, during the 1940s, Haitian artists created commercial reproductions of "voodoo images" provided to them by foreign businessmen, to sell as "authentic voodoo art." To the Haitian artists, the foreign representations of Haitian artistic culture, which they were paid to make, demonstrated the art-theft inherent to cultural appropriation and how White foreigners truly saw Haitian Vodou art as a commercial commodity, and not as religious art.

=== Deities and souvenirs ===
To distinguish a work of art from a crude artefact made for tourists, art collectors consider an artwork to be artistically authentic when it meets recognised standards of artistic production (design, materials, manufacture) for an original purpose. In the Philippine Islands, throughout their history, the Igorot people have used carved-wood bulul figurines to guard the rice crop; the bulul is a highly stylized representation of an ancestor that gains power from the presence of an ancestral spirit.

Although still used in traditional ceremonies, the Igorot people now produce souvenir bulul figurines for tourists; a secondary purpose that does not devalue the bulul as art. Within the culture, an Igorot family might use a souvenir bulul as suitable and acceptable for traditional ceremonies — thereby granting the souvenir bulul an artistic and cultural authenticity otherwise absent. From that perspective, "tribal masks and sculptures" actually used in religious ceremonies have greater commodity value, especially if authenticity of provenance determines that a native artist created the artefact by using traditional designs, materials, and production techniques. Such Western over-valuation of native art is predicated by the artefact being an authentic example of a tradition or style of art practised by a primitive people.

=== Invented traditions ===
The artistic evolution of the Maroon people of French Guiana, shows that contemporary artistic styles developed through the interaction of art and commerce, between artists and art businessmen. The long history and strong traditions of Maroon art are notable in the forms of decoration of everyday objects, such as boat paddles and window shutters, art of entirely aesthetic purpose. To sell Maroon artworks, European art collectors assigned symbolism to the "native art" they sold in the art markets, to collectors, and to museums; a specific provenance. Despite the mutual miscommunication betwixt artists and businessmen about the purpose, value, and price of works of art, Maroon artists used the European semiotic language to assign symbolic meanings to their works of native art, and make a living; yet young Maroon artists might mistakenly believe that the (commercial) symbolism derives from ancestral traditions, rather than from the art business.

== Expressive authenticity ==
Authenticity of expression derives from the work of art possessing the original and inherent authority of the artist's intent, that the work is an original product of aesthetic expression. In musical performance, authenticity of expression can conflict with authenticity of performance when the performance of the musician or the singer is true to his or her artistry, and is not an imitation of another artist. The greater popularity of the performer, rather than of the composer of the song and the music, is an historically recent development that reflects the public's greater interest in the expressive authenticity of charismatic musicians who possess a distinctive artistic style.

In the fields of art and of aesthetics, the term expressive authenticity derives from the psychological term Authenticity, as used in existential philosophy, regarding mental health as a person's self-knowledge about his or her relation to the real world. In that vein, the artistic production of Abstract Expressionists, such as Jackson Pollock (1912–1956), Arshile Gorky (1904–1948)), and Willem de Kooning (1904–1997), have been understood in existentialist terms about the artists’ relation with and to the world; likewise the cinematic art of the cinéastes Jean-Luc Godard and Ingmar Bergman (1904–1997).

Expressive authenticity derives from the artist's authenticity of style and tradition, thus an outsider's appropriation of voice is disallowed because the cultural group already have native artists producing authentic art. In the American music business, the Hip hop genre originally was musical art created by poor Black people to address their discontents about the poverty, ignorance, and racism imposed upon them in American society. Artists debate if Hip hop's profitable transition from the artistic underground to the commercial mainstream has voided the authenticity of expression of the music. In "Authenticity Within Hip Hop and Other Cultures Threatened with Assimilation", the academic Kembrew McLeod said that the cultural authenticity of Hip hop is threatened by assimilation into the music business, where commercialism replaces expressive authenticity.

== Authenticity of performance ==
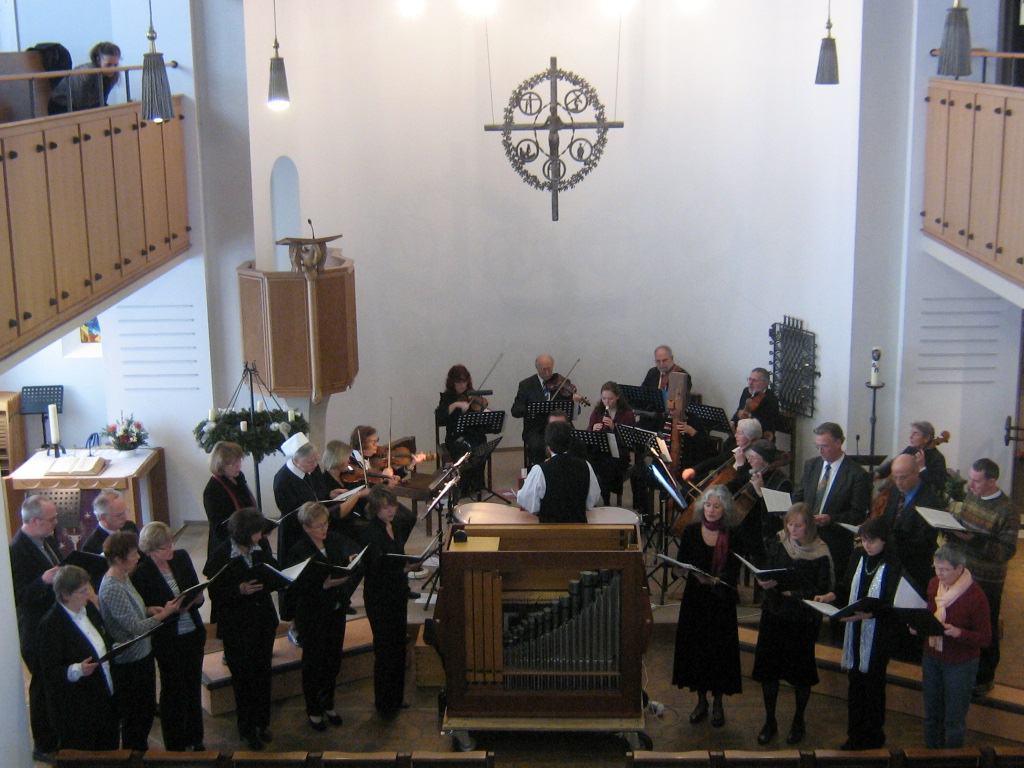
Authenticity of performance: A Baroque music ensemble playing Baroque period instruments, using period techniques, whilst dressed in contemporary garb.

In the theatre and in music, the performers (actors, actresses, musicians) are responsible for realising a performance of the respective work of art, a stageplay, a musical concert. An historically informed performance of a play by Shakespeare, the women characters would be portrayed by actors, not actresses, as was the custom in the Elizabethan era (1558–1603) and the dialogue would be enunciated and pronounced in the Elizabethan style of speech. In an historically informed performance, the actors and the musicians replicate the time period of the work of art they are performing, usually by way of period-correct language and costumes and styles of performance and musical instruments. The musicians would consider inauthentic any performance of the Elvira Madigan piano concerto that the pianist played on a contemporary grand piano, an instrument unknown to the composer W.A. Mozart (1756–1791).

== Authenticity in Crypto art ==
The genre of crypto art became feasible with blockchain networks of computers (e.g. Bitcoin), cybernetic technology that allows crypto artists to create digital art for sale and for collection. Artists, such as Mike Winkelmann (aka Beeple), use blockchain technology to authenticate a work of art and establish provenance with a digital file permanently linked to the crypto artist who produced the artefact; however, the blockchain technology also allows crypto artists to work anonymously. The cybernetic authentication of Non-fungible tokens (NFT) allows collecting works of art that resist forgery, because the provenance of a work of art usually is private information unavailable for public examination.

== See also ==
- Fine art authentication
- Appropriation (art)
- Authentication
- Authenticity (philosophy)
- Auteur theory
- Folklore
- Forgery
- Plagiarism
- Selling out
- Stuckism
- Tradition

== Sources ==
- Abbing, Hans (2002). Why are artists poor?: the exceptional economy of the arts. Amsterdam University Press. ISBN 90-5356-565-5.
- Baaz, Maria Eriksson; Palmberg, Mai (2001). "Questioning 'Authenticity': The Case of Contemporary Zimbabwean Stone Sculpture". Same and other: negotiating African identity in cultural production. Nordic Africa Institute. ISBN 91-7106-477-X.
- Bendix, Regina (1997). In search of authenticity: the formation of folklore studies. Univ of Wisconsin Press. ISBN 0-299-15540-4.
- Benjamin, Walter (1936). "The Work of Art in the Age of Mechanical Reproduction".
- Carrier, James G. (2005). A handbook of economic anthropology. Edward Elgar Publishing. ISBN 1-84376-175-0.
- Coleman, Elizabeth Burns (2005). Aboriginal art, identity and appropriation. Ashgate Publishing, Ltd. ISBN 0-7546-4403-0.
- Crowell, Steven (2010). "Existentialism". In Edward N. Zalta (ed.). The Stanford Encyclopedia of Philosophy (Winter 2010 Edition).
- Davies, Stephen; Higgins, Kathleen Marie; Hopkins, Robert (2009). "authenticity and art". A Companion to Aesthetics. John Wiley and Sons. ISBN 978-1-4051-6922-6.
- Dyrness, William A.; Kärkkäinen, Veli-Matti; Martinez, Juan Francisco (2008). Global Dictionary of Theology: A Resource for the Worldwide Church. InterVarsity Press. ISBN 978-0-8308-2454-0.
- Dutton, Denis (2003). "Authenticity in Art". In Jerrold Levinson (ed.). The Oxford Handbook of Aesthetics. New York: Oxford University Press. ISBN 978-0-19-927945-6.
- Fleming, Stuart (4 December 1975). "Science detects the forgeries". New Scientist.
- Goodman, Nelson (1976). "Art and Authenticity". Languages of art: an approach to a theory of symbols. Hackett Publishing. pp. 99–126. ISBN 978-0-915144-34-1.
- Hind, Arthur Mayger (1935). An introduction to a history of woodcut: with a detailed survey of work done in the fifteenth century, Volume 1. Constable and Company, ltd.
- Koestler, Arthur (1964). The act of creation. Arkana. ISBN 0-14-019191-7.
- Larsen, Knut Einar, ed. (1995). Nara Conference on Authenticity, Japan 1994: Proceedings. UNESCO/ICCROM/ICOMOS. ISBN 82-519-1416-7.
- Larsen, Knut Einar; Marstein, Nils, eds. (1994). Conference on Authenticity in Relation to the World Heritage Convention, Preparatory Workshop, Bergen, Norway, 31 January - 2 February 1994. Norwegian Directorate for Cultural Heritage. ISBN 82-519-1445-0.
- Macey, Patrick, Jeremy Noble, Jeffrey Dean, and Gustave Reese (2010). Dean Roote (ed.). Josquin des Prez. Grove Music Online.
- McAndrew, Clare (2010). Fine Art and High Finance: Expert Advice on the Economics of Ownership. Bloomberg Press. ISBN 978-1-57660-333-8.
- McGowan, Kate (2000). The Year's Work in Critical and Cultural Theory Volume 7: 1997. Wiley-Blackwell. ISBN 0-631-21930-7.
- McLeod, Kembrew (Autumn 1999). "Authenticity Within Hip-Hop and Other Cultures Threatened with Assimilation" (PDF). Journal of Communication. 49 (4): 134–150. doi:10.1111/j.1460-2466.1999.tb02821.x. Archived from the original (PDF) on 2009-03-18.
- Phillips, David (1997). Exhibiting authenticity. Manchester University Press. ISBN 0-7190-4797-8.
- Potter, Andrew (2010). The Authenticity Hoax: How We Get Lost Finding Ourselves. McClelland & Stewart. ISBN 978-0-7710-7105-8.
- Price, Sally (2007). "Into the Mainstream: Shifting Authenticities in Art" (PDF). American Ethnologist. 34 (4): 603–620. doi:10.1525/ae.2007.34.4.603. Archived from the original (PDF) on 2011-10-05.
- Richman, Karen E. (Spring 2008). "Innocent Imitations? Authenticity and Mimesis in Haitian Vodou Art, Tourism, and Anthropology". Ethnohistory. 55 (2): 203–227. doi:10.1215/00141801-2007-061.
- Rose, Tricia (1994). Black Noise: Rap Music and Black Culture in Contemporary America. Middletown, CT: Wesleyan University Press. ISBN 0-8195-6275-0.
- Scaff, Julian H. "Art and Authenticity in the age of Digital Reproduction". Digital Arts Institute. Archived from the original on 2011-07-24.
- Scharfstein, Ben-Ami (2009). Art without borders: a philosophical exploration of art and humanity. University of Chicago Press. p. 99. ISBN 978-0-226-73609-9.
- Schefold, R. (April 2002). "Stylistic canon, imitation and faking: Authenticity in Mentawai art in Western Indonesia". Anthropology Today. 18 (2): 10–14. doi:10.1111/1467-8322.00109.
- Spencer, Ronald D. (2004). The expert versus the object: judging fakes and false attributions in the visual arts. Oxford University Press US. ISBN 0-19-514735-9.
- Sorce Keller, Marcello (2012). What Makes Music European - Looking Beyond Sound. The Scarecrow Press, Inc., Lanham, Maryland, US. ISBN 978-0-8108-7671-2.
- UNESCO (2011). "Operational Guidelines for the Implementation of the World Heritage Convention" (PDF). UNESCO.
- van der Grijp, Paul (2009). Art and exoticism: an anthropology of the yearning for authenticity. LIT Verlag Münster. ISBN 978-3-8258-1667-4.
- Wood, A. M.; Linley, P. A.; Maltby, J.; Baliousis, M.; Joseph, S. (2008). "The authentic personality: A theoretical and empirical conceptualization, and the development of the Authenticity Scale" (PDF). Journal of Counseling Psychology. 55 (3): 385–399. doi:10.1037/0022-0167.55.3.385. Archived from the original (PDF) on 2011-07-17.
