= Association of Legal Writing Directors =

US-Canada-Australia professional association

The Association of Legal Writing Directors (ALWD), formed in 1996, is a non-profit professional association of directors and former directors of legal research, writing, analysis, and advocacy programs from law schools in the United States, Canada and Australia. The goal of this organization is to "improving legal education and the analytic, reasoning, and writing abilities of lawyers." The ALWD has more than 400 members representing more than 130 law schools.

ALWD is headquartered at Chicago-Kent College of Law, 565 West Adams Street, Chicago, IL 60661–3691.

The ALWD compiles the ALWD Guide to Legal Citation, which primarily competes with the Bluebook style guide, a system developed by the law reviews at Harvard, Yale, University of Pennsylvania, and Columbia.
