= The Work of Art in the Age of Mechanical Reproduction =

1935 essay by Walter Benjamin

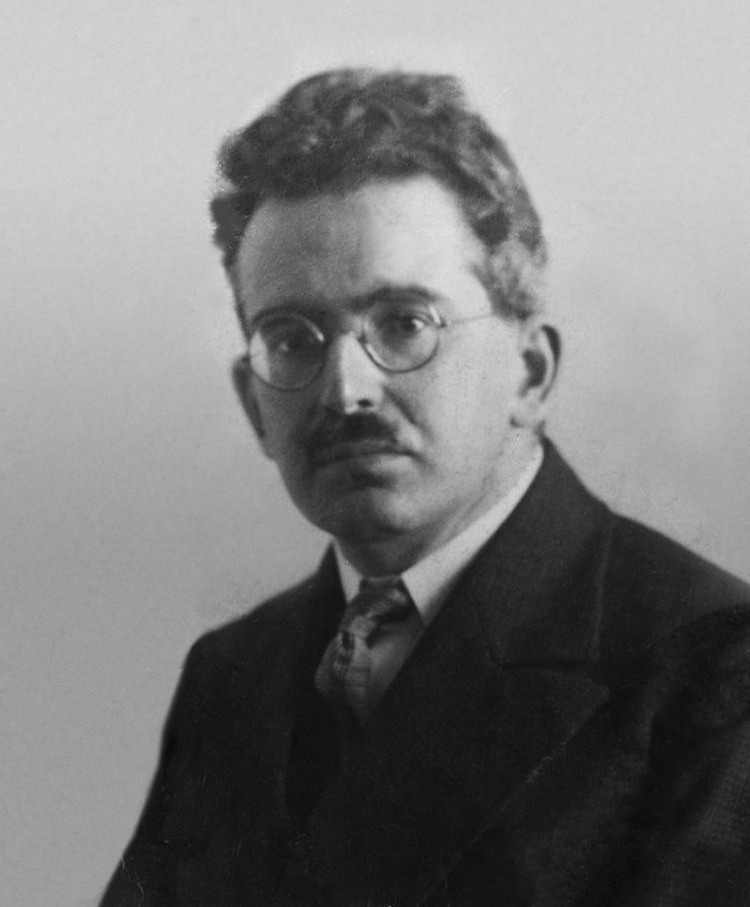
In "The Work of Art in the Age of Mechanical Reproduction" (1935), Walter Benjamin addresses the artistic and cultural, social, economic, and political functions of art in a capitalist society.

"The Work of Art in the Age of Mechanical Reproduction" (German: Das Kunstwerk im Zeitalter seiner technischen Reproduzierbarkeit; 1935), by Walter Benjamin, is an essay of cultural criticism which proposes and explains that mechanical reproduction devalues the aura (uniqueness) of a work of art, and that in the age of mechanical reproduction and the absence of traditional and ritualistic values, the production of art would be inherently based upon the praxis of politics.

The essay was written during the Nazi régime (1933–1945) in Germany. Its first draft was composed in 1935 during the year that the Nuremberg Race Laws were passed in the Third Reich and Leni Riefenstahl's film documentary of the Nuremberg Rally (Triumph of the Will) debuted to critical praise, sweeping the film awards across Europe. The essay presents a theory of art that is "useful for the formulation of revolutionary demands in the politics of art" in a mass culture. It remains a prophetic and trenchantly anti-fascist manifesto, instructing readers in the interpretation of mass cultural forms inclined towards the fertilization and acceleration of totalitarianism.

Benjamin's essay is concerned with several ideas: the aura of a work of art; the artistic authenticity of the artefact; the cultural authority of the work of art; and the aestheticization of politics for the production of art. As a result, it has become a foundational theoretical resource in the fields of art history and architectural theory, cultural studies, and media theory.

== Summary ==
Benjamin presents the thematic bases for a theory of art by quoting the essay "The Conquest of Ubiquity" (1928), by Paul Valéry, to establish how works of art created and developed in past eras are different from contemporary works of art; he argues that the understanding and treatment of art and of artistic technique must progressively develop in order to understand a work of art in the context of the modern time.

Our fine arts were developed, their types and uses were established, in times very different from the present, by men whose power of action upon things was insignificant in comparison with ours. But the amazing growth of our techniques, the adaptability and precision they have attained, the ideas and habits they are creating, make it a certainty that profound changes are impending in the ancient craft of the Beautiful. In all the arts there is a physical component which can no longer be considered or treated as it used to be, which cannot remain unaffected by our modern knowledge and power. For the last twenty years neither matter nor space nor time has been what it was from time immemorial. We must expect great innovations to transform the entire technique of the arts, thereby affecting artistic invention itself and perhaps even bringing about an amazing change in our very notion of art.

=== Artistic production ===
In the preface to the essay, Benjamin presents Marxist analyses of the organisation of a capitalist society and of the place of the arts in a capitalist society, both in the public sphere and in the private sphere; and explains the socio-economic conditions of society to extrapolate future developments of capitalism that will result in the economic exploitation of the proletariat, and so will produce the socio-economic conditions that would abolish capitalism. By reviewing the historical and technological developments of the mechanical means for reproducing a work of art, Benjamin establishes that artistic reproduction is not a modern human activity, such as the industrial arts of the foundry and the stamp mill in Ancient Greece (12th–9th c. BC), and the modern arts of woodcut relief-printing and engraving, etching, lithography, and photography, which are industrial techniques of mass production that permit greater accuracy in the mechanical reproduction of a work of art than would an artist manually reproducing an artefact created by a master artist.

=== Authenticity ===
The aura of a work of art derives from authenticity (uniqueness) and locale (physical and cultural); Benjamin explains that "even the most perfect reproduction of a work of art is lacking in one element: Its presence in time and space, its unique existence at the place where it happens to be" located. That the "sphere of [artistic] authenticity is outside the technical [sphere]" of mechanised reproduction. Therefore, in being unique, the original work of art is an objet d'art independent of the mechanically accurate reproduction; yet, by changing the cultural context of where the artwork is located, the existence of the mechanical copy (an art-product) diminishes the aesthetic value of the original work of art. In that way, the aura – the unique aesthetic authority of a work of art – is absent from the mechanically produced copy.

=== Value: cult and exhibition ===
Regarding the social functions of an artefact, Benjamin said that "Works of art are received and valued on different planes. Two polar types stand out; with one, the accent is on the cult value; with the other, on the exhibition value of the work. Artistic production begins with ceremonial objects destined to serve in a cult. One may assume that what mattered was their existence, not their being on view." The cult value of religious art is in the fact that "certain statues of gods are accessible only to the priest in the cella; certain madonnas remain covered nearly all year round; certain sculptures on medieval cathedrals are invisible to the spectator on ground level." In practice, the diminished cult value of a religious artefact (an icon no longer venerated) increases the exhibition value of the artefact as art created for the spectators' appreciation, because "it is easier to exhibit a portrait bust, that can be sent here and there [to museums], than to exhibit the statue of a divinity that has its fixed place in the interior of a temple."

The mechanical reproduction of a work of art voids its cult value, because removal from a fixed, private space (a temple) and placement in a mobile, public space (a museum) allows exhibiting the work of art to many spectators. Further explaining the transition from cult value to exhibition value, Benjamin said that in "the photographic image, exhibition value, for the first time, shows its superiority to cult value." In emphasising exhibition value, "the work of art becomes a creation with entirely new functions," which "later may be recognized as incidental" to the original purpose for which the artist created the objet d'art.

As a medium of artistic production, the cinema (moving pictures) does not create cult value for the motion picture, itself, because "the audience's identification with the actor is really an identification with the camera. Consequently, the audience takes the position of the camera; [the audience's] approach is that of testing. This is not the approach to which cult values may be exposed." Therefore, "the film makes the cult value recede into the background, not only by putting the public in the position of the critic, but also by the fact that, at the movies, this [critical] position requires no attention."

=== Art as politics ===
The social value of a work of art changes as a society change their value systems; thus the changes in artistic styles and in the cultural tastes of the public follow "the manner in which human sense-perception is organized [and] the [artistic] medium in which it is accomplished [are] determined not only by Nature, but by historical circumstances, as well."

Despite the negative effects (social, economic, cultural) of mass-produced art-products upon the aura of the original work of art, Benjamin said that "the uniqueness of a work of art is inseparable from its being embedded in the fabric of tradition", which separates the original work of art from the reproduction. Moreover, Benjamin noted that the ritualization of the mechanical reproduction of art also emancipated "the work of art from its parasitical dependence on ritual", thereby increasing the social value of exhibiting works of art; a social and cultural practice that has progressed from the private sphere of life (the owner's enjoyment of the aesthetics of the artefacts, usually high art) to the public sphere of life, wherein the public enjoy the same aesthetics in a gallery displaying works of art.

== Composition and publication ==
"The Work of Art in the Age of its Technological Reproducibility" was conceived by Benjamin as a contemporary complement to his much larger Arcades Project. He began writing the essay in 1935, from his home in exile in Paris. In October he mentioned the essay in letters to Gretel Karplus and Max Horkheimer, telling the latter that the essay was the beginning of "a materialist theory of art". The title in German is 'Das Kunstwerk im Zeitalter seiner technischen Reproduzierbarkeit'. Between December 1935 and February 1936 Benjamin largely rewrote the essay, and added footnotes – it is this 'second version' that is considered to be the 'urtext', notably by the film historian Miriam Hansen. In his letter of October 1935 Benjamin had suggested to Horkheimer that the essay might be published in the Frankfurt School journal Zeitschrift für Sozialforschung. Horkheimer agreed to this, on condition that the essay should appear in French translation. Benjamin – then residing in France and deeply concerned with French politics – readily agreed, and collaborated with the philosopher-translator Pierre Klossowski, finishing the translation work in parallel with his completion of the revised essay itself.

In spite of what Howard Eiland calls Benjamin's "meticulous collaboration" with Klossowski, publication in the Zeitschrift was far from straightforward, with editorial intervention leading to what Benjamin regarded as a toning down of the political intensity of the piece. In spite of these problems, the essay was published in 1936 in Volume 5, Issue 1 of the Zeitschrift für Sozialforschung, in Klossowski's French translation, with the title: "L'œuvre d'art à l'époque de sa reproduction mécanisée", followed by abstracts in German and English. Horkheimer's decision to publish in French was immediately vindicated, as the essay was widely discussed in French intellectual circles. Benjamin continued to revise the essay down to 1939, and it is this third version that was the first to appear in German, in 1955, in the Gesammelte Schriften, and in English as 'The Work of Art in the Age of Mechanical Reproduction' in the 1969 volume Illuminations, translated by Harry Zohn. The second (1935/36) version is now often preferred as the 'Ur-text', and is the text translated in the 2008 Harvard University Press edition titled The Work of Art in the Age of Its Technological Reproducibility, and Other Writings on Media.

== Critique ==
Miklos Legrady takes issue with Benjamin’s comment "that which withers in the age of mechanical reproduction is the aura of the work of art", pointing out that books are made by mechanical reproduction, yet images, and literature retain their aura as much as any individual and unique work of art. The power of art does not reside in the uniqueness of the physical object, but in the statement made by the artist through the work. Reproducing that statement does not weaken it but strengthens its impact with each additional person such a reproduction reaches. Munch's "The Scream", for example, is known mostly from reproduction yet its aura, its power to impress, does not come from the uniqueness of a painting or drawing, but the uniqueness of the work’s content, which retains its effect no matter how often reproduced.

Theodor Adorno's essay On the Fetish Character in Music and the Regression of Listening is regarded as a polemic against Benjamin's essay. While it agrees that mass art can be used for political ends (his essay the germinal piece of writing for Adorno's theory of the culture industry), at the same time it claims the fine art praised by Benjamin can become a form of commodity fetishism for its enjoyers.

== Influence ==
In the late-twentieth-century television program Ways of Seeing (1972), John Berger proceeded from and developed the themes of Benjamin's essay to explain the contemporary representations of social class and racial caste inherent to the politics and production of art. Berger contends that in transforming a work of art into a commodity, the modern means of artistic production and of artistic reproduction have destroyed the aesthetic, cultural, and political authority of art: "For the first time ever, images of art have become ephemeral, ubiquitous, insubstantial, available, valueless, free," because they are commercial products that lack the aura of authenticity of the original objet d'art.

=== Paralipomena ===
A paralipomena of Benjamin's "Work of Art..." called a "A Short History of Photography", read together with the main essay, provides a theoretical basis for Susan Sontag's well-known monograph, On Photography.

Amongst other smaller pieces and a fragments belonging to the paralipomena are Benjamin's second "Letter from Paris", pressed in Moscow in Brecht's journal Das Wort (1936), Theories of German Fascism (1931), and the unpublished fragment on Chaplin (1935) and the analogy between the atomization of flow in industrial labor—where the sustained and skillful attention to craft is broken down into discrete, endlessly repetitive gestures that make no sense in themselves, or from the individual perspective, only cohering in the context of the assembly-line—and the way in which film produces a similar discontinuity in time perception by editing. "With regard to continuity it cannot be overlooked that the assembly line, which plays such a fundamental role in the process of production, is in a sense represented by the filmstrip in the process of consumption." The end of the piece expands on how the secret of Charlie Chaplin's major success in the medium has to do with the way that his style of movement and gesture are perfectly adapted to this discontinuity. The passage reads like an outtake from "The Work of Art...", and its date supports this view.

"The Letter from Paris" is generally assumed to be the piece that put Benjamin on the gestapo's radar and led to his name being placed onto the index librorum prohibitorum of the Third Reich.

Ideas initially presented in this article also inform Marshall McLuhan's famous slogan or conception that "the medium is the message".

== See also ==
- Art for art's sake
