= Legal citation =

Legal citations in court documents

Legal citation is the practice of crediting and referring to authoritative documents and sources. The most common sources of authority cited are court decisions (cases), statutes, regulations, government documents, treaties, and scholarly writing.

Typically, a proper legal citation will inform the reader about a source's authority, how strongly the source supports the writer's proposition, its age, and other, relevant information.

== Citation by country ==
Some countries have a de facto citation standard that has been adopted by most of the country's institutions.

=== Australia ===
Australian legal citation usually follows the Australian Guide to Legal Citation (commonly known as AGLC)

=== Canada ===
Canadian legal citation usually follows the Canadian Guide to Uniform Legal Citation (commonly called the McGill Guide)

=== Germany ===
German legal citation

=== Ireland ===
OSCOLA Ireland is the system of legal citation for Ireland. OSCOLA Ireland was adapted from the Oxford Standard for Citation of Legal Authorities. It is edited by a group of Irish academics, in consultation with both the OSCOLA Ireland Editorial Advisory Board, and the OSCOLA Editorial Advisory Board.

=== Netherlands ===
Dutch legal citation follows the Leidraad voor juridische auteurs (commonly known as Leidraad)

=== New Zealand ===
New Zealand legal citation follows the format of the New Zealand Law Style Guide, drafted by the New Zealand Law Foundation.

=== United Kingdom ===
The Oxford Standard for Citation of Legal Authorities (commonly known as OSCOLA) is the modern authority on citation of United Kingdom legislation. Guidance for UK government drafters is provided in Statutory Instrument Practice.

=== USA ===
==== Citation guides ====
U. S. legal citation follows one of:

- Bluebook standard
- ALWD Citation Manual
- Tanbook (New York State Official Reports Style Manual)
- Greenbook (Texas Style Manual, supplements Bluebook)
- Yellowbook (California Style Manual, replaces Bluebook)
- Maroonbook (University of Chicago Law School)

A number of U.S. states have adopted individual public domain citations standards.

==== Example of Supreme Court case citation ====
This is an example citation to a United States Supreme Court court case:

Griswold v. Connecticut, 381 U.S. 479, 480 (1965).

This citation gives helpful information about the cited authority to the reader.

- The names of the parties are Griswold and Connecticut. Generally, the name of the plaintiff (or, on appeal, petitioner) appears first, whereas the name of the defendant (or, on appeal, respondent) appears second. Thus, the case is Griswold v. Connecticut.
- The case is reported in volume 381 of the United States Reports (abbreviated "U.S."). The case begins on page 479 of that volume of the report. The authoritative supporting material for the writer's proposition is on page 480. The reference to page 480 is referred to as a "pincite" or "pinpoint."
- The Supreme Court decided the case. Because the U.S. Reports publish only cases that the Supreme Court decides, the court deciding the case may be inferred from the reporter.
- The authority supports the proposition directly because it is not qualified with a signal. If it had offered only indirect or inferential support for the proposition, the author should have preceded the cite with a qualifying signal such as see or cf.
- The authority is from 1965, so either the clear and enduring wisdom of this source has been venerated by the test of time, or this clearly dated relic of another era is obviously ripe for revision, depending upon the needs of the writer.

Concurring and dissenting opinions are also published alongside the Court's opinion. For example, to cite to the opinion in which Justices Stewart and Black dissent, the citation would appear as the following:

Griswold v. Connecticut, 381 U.S. 479, 527 (1965) (Stewart & Black, JJ., dissenting).

This citation is very similar to the citation to the Court's opinion. The two key differences are the pincite, page 527 here, and the addition of the dissenting justices' names in a parenthetical following the date of the case.

Legal citation in general and case citation in particular can become much more complicated.

== Legal citation analysis ==
During a legal proceeding, a 'legal citation analysis' - i.e. using citation analysis technique for analyzing legal documents - facilitates the better understanding of the inter-related regulatory compliance documents by the exploration of the citations that connect provisions to other provisions within the same document or between different documents. Legal citation analysis involves the use of a citation graph extracted from a regulatory document, which could supplement E-discovery - a process that leverages on technological innovations in big data analytics. Main path analysis, a method that traces the significant citation chains in a citation graph, can be used to trace the opinion changes over the years for a target legal domain.

== See also ==
- Case citation
- Citation analysis
- Citation of United Kingdom legislation
- Legal citation signals
- Oxford Standard for Citation Of Legal Authorities or "OSCOLA"
- Sub nomine
- Main path analysis
- Citator, an index of citations
- Citation index
