= Aestheticization of politics =

Political idea

The aestheticization of politics was an idea coined in "The Work of Art in the Age of Mechanical Reproduction" by critical theorist Walter Benjamin as being a key ingredient to fascist regimes. Benjamin said that fascism tends towards an aestheticization of politics, in the sense of a spectacle in which it allows the masses to express themselves without seeing their rights recognized, and without affecting the relations of ownership which the proletarian masses aim to eliminate. Benjamin said:

Fascism attempts to organize the newly proletarianized masses without affecting the property structure which the masses strive to eliminate. Fascism sees its salvation in giving these masses not their right, but instead a chance to express themselves. The masses have a right to change property relations; Fascism seeks to give them an expression while preserving property. The logical result of Fascism is the introduction of aesthetics into political life. [...] Mankind, which in Homer’s time was a spectacle for the Olympian gods, has become one for itself. [...] Communism responds by politicizing art.

In the essay, Benjamin connected the concept to the Italian Futurist movement and its involvement in the fascist regime of Italy.

Alternately, "politicization of aesthetics" (or "politicization of art") has been used as a term for an ideologically opposing synthesis, wherein art is ultimately subordinate to political life and thus a result of it, separate from it, but which is attempted to be incorporated for political use as theory relating to the consequential political nature of art. Professor of Contemporary History, Emilio Gentile has stressed that these two ideas are not mutually exclusive, overlapping to a large degree.

In Benjamin's original formulation, the politicization of aesthetics was considered the opposite of the aestheticization of politics, the latter possibly being indicated as an instrument of "mythologizing" totalitarian Fascist regimes. The "politicizing of art", in contrast, requires one to "[affirm] the political value and force of art [by] demystifying concepts like genius and eternal value [and by] demystifying the idea [...] that art expresses the essential nature of some nation or race". In other words, to politicize art is to recognize that it is fundamentally a product that exists within a specific socio-cultural context; communism thus "takes art seriously not just as a cultural product but as a cultural force".

Benjamin's concept has been linked to Guy Debord's 1967 book, The Society of the Spectacle.

== See also ==
- Aestheticization of violence
- Art for art's sake
- The arts and politics
- Communicative rationality
- Instrumental and value rationality
- Martha Nussbaum
- Normativity
- Rationality
- Relations of production
- Separate spheres
- Spectacle (critical theory)

== Primary sources ==
- "The Work of Art in the Age of Mechanical Reproduction", in n Walter Benjamin Illuminations. Some excerpts quoted in Susan Buck-Morss (1992) Aesthetic and Anaesthetics: Walter Benjamin's Artwork Essay Reconsidered, in October, n.62 Fall 1992, pp.3-41.
