= Violence in art =

Violence as depicted in high and popular culture

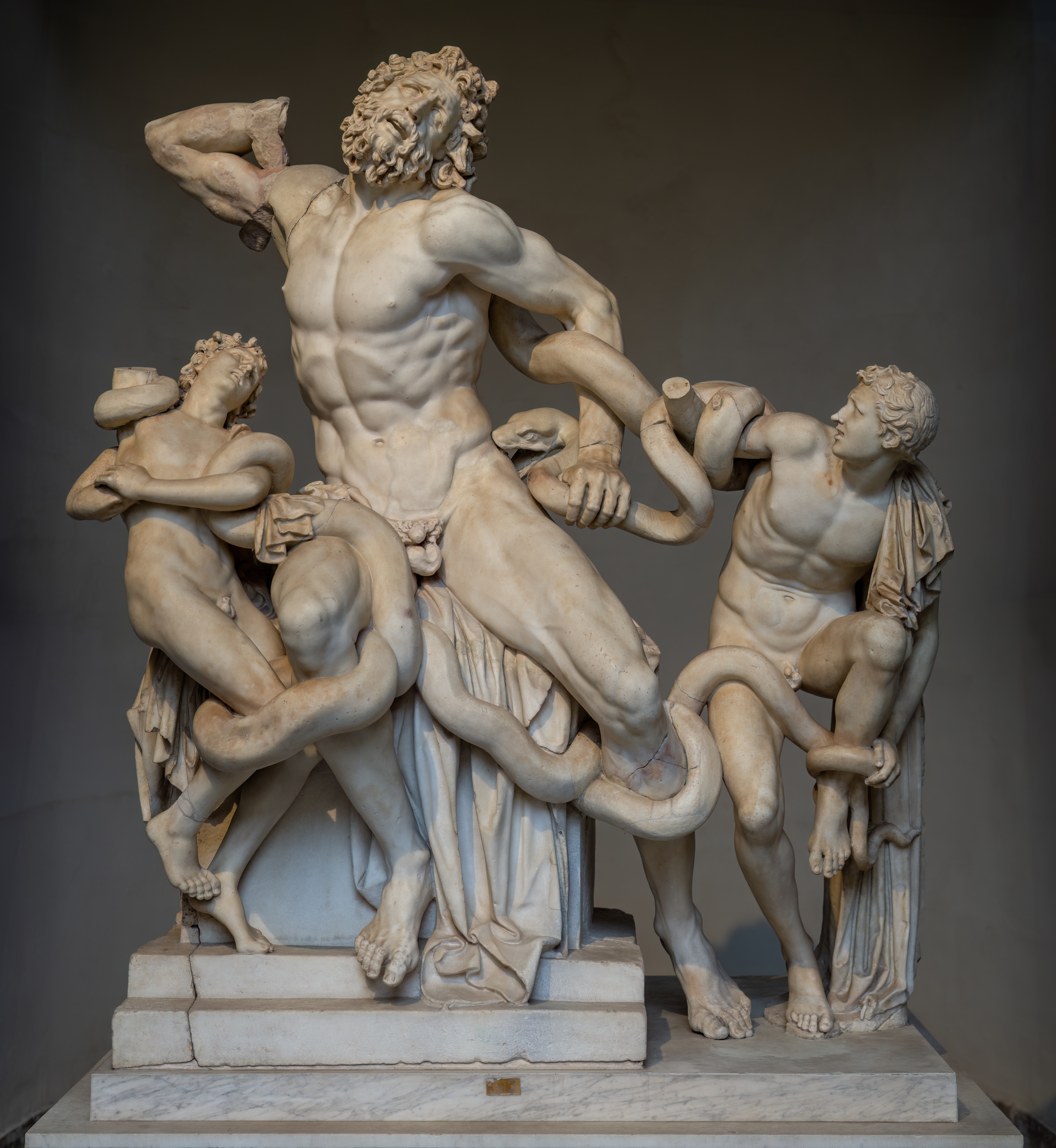
Laocoön and His Sons

Depictions of violence have been the subject of considerable controversy and debate for centuries. In particular, violence has appeared in both high culture and film.

== History in art ==
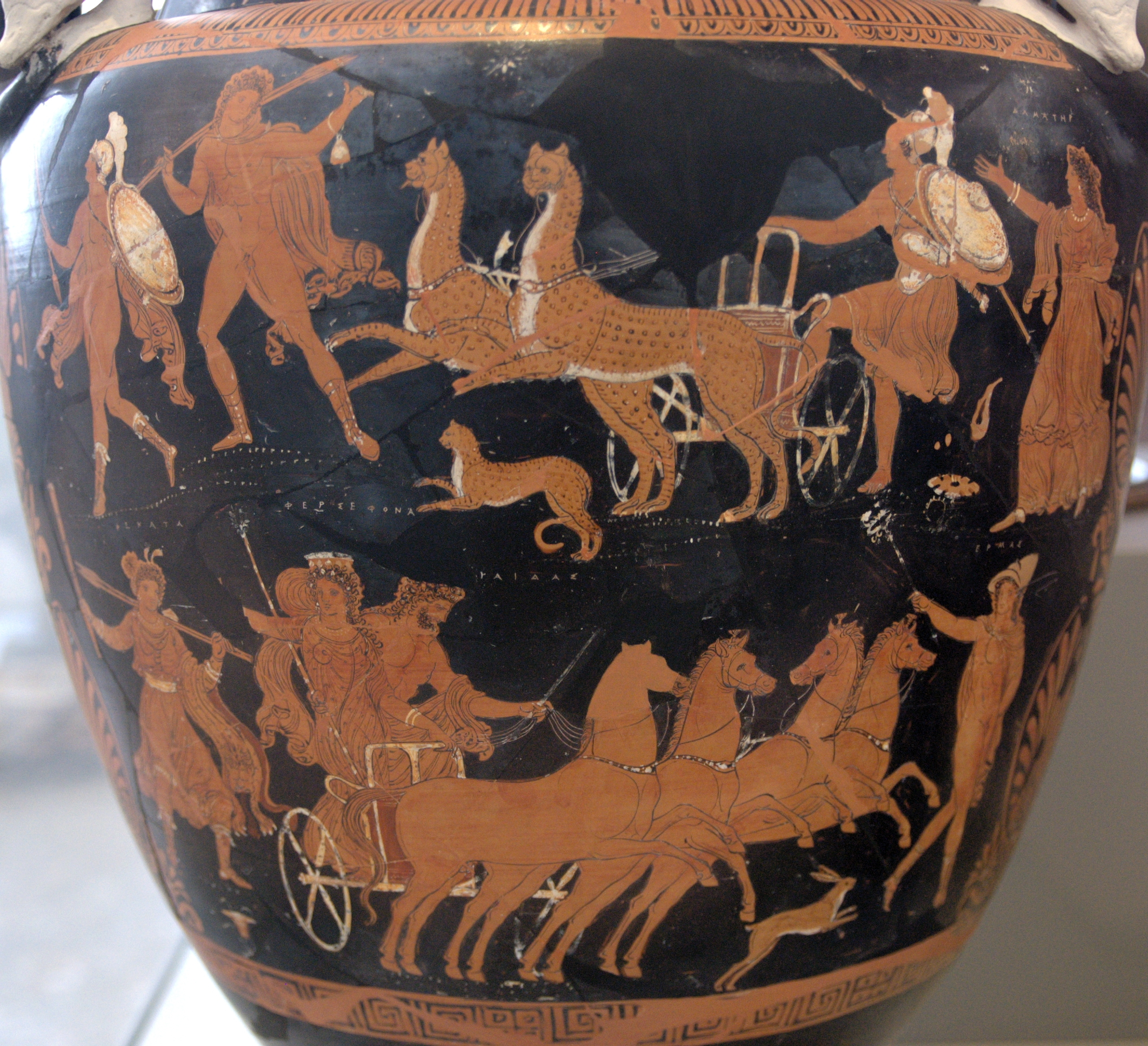
Rape of Persephone. Hades with his horses and Persephone (down). An Apulian red-figure volute krater, c. 340 BC. Antikensammlung Berlin

=== 15th century to 17th century ===
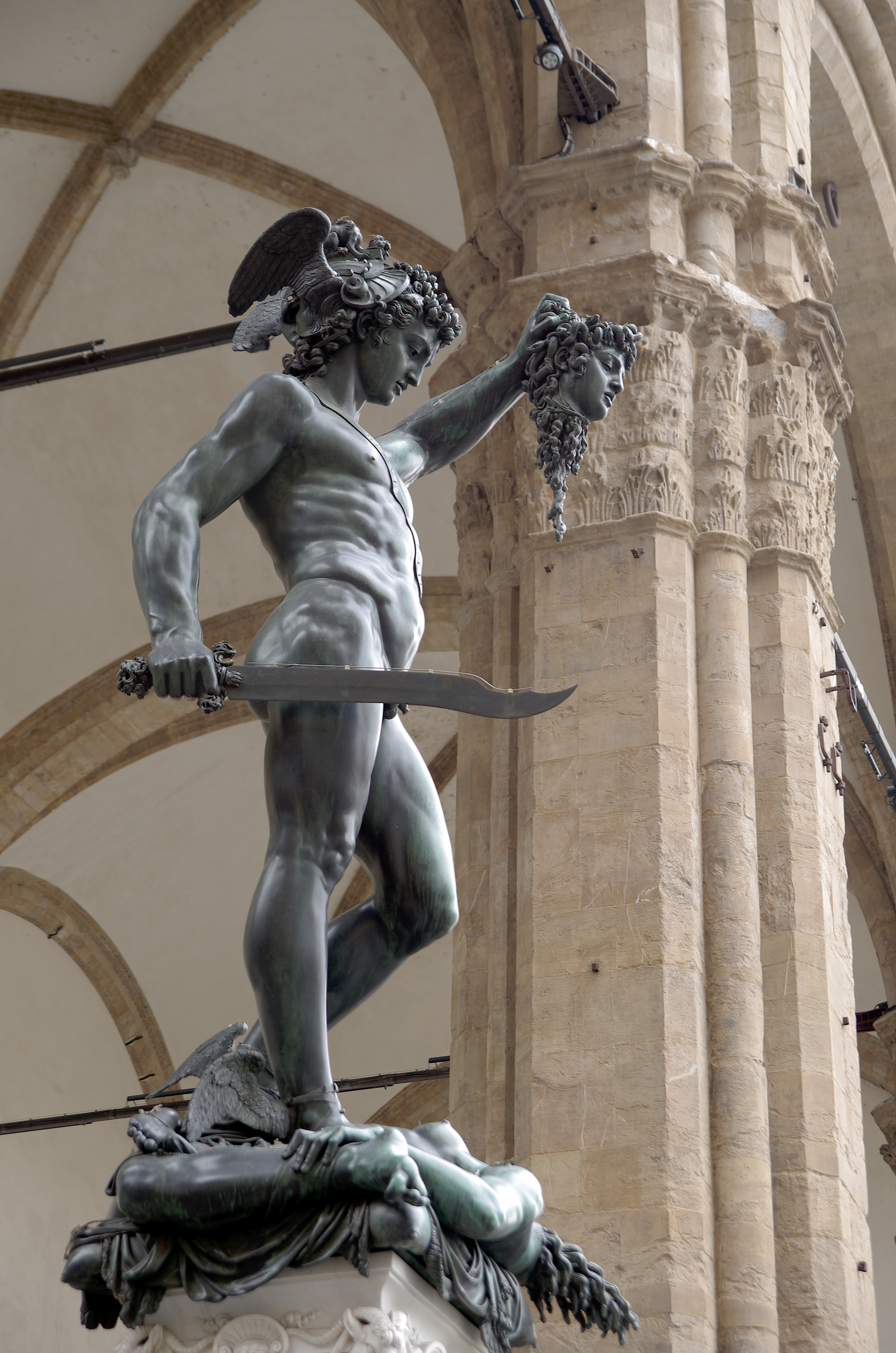
Perseus with the Head of Medusa

Politics of House of Medici and Florence dominate art depicted in Piazza della Signoria, making references to first three Florentine dukes. Besides aesthetical depiction of violence these sculptures are noted for weaving through a political narrative.

The artist Hieronymus Bosch, from the 15th and 16th centuries, used images of demons, half-human animals and machines to evoke fear and confusion to portray the evil of man. The 16th-century artist Pieter Brueghel the Elder depicted "...the nightmarish imagery that reflect, if in an extreme fashion, popular dread of the Apocalypse and Hell".

=== 18th century onwards ===
In the mid-18th century, Giovanni Battista Piranesi, an Italian etcher, archaeologist, and architect active from 1740, did etchings of imaginary prisons that depicted people "stretched on racks or trapped like rats in maze-like dungeons", an "aestheticization of violence and suffering".

In 1849, as revolutions raged in European streets and authorities were putting down protests and consolidating state powers, composer Richard Wagner wrote: "I have an enormous desire to practice a little artistic terrorism."

Laurent Tailhade is reputed to have stated, after Auguste Vaillant bombed the Chamber of Deputies in 1893: "Qu'importent les victimes, si le geste est beau? [What do the victims matter, so long as the gesture is beautiful]?" In 1929 André Breton's Second Manifesto on surrealist art stated that "L'acte surréaliste le plus simple consiste, revolvers aux poings, à descendre dans la rue et à tirer au hasard, tant qu'on peut, dans la foule" [The simplest Surrealist act consists of running down into the street, pistols in hand, and firing blindly, as fast as you can pull the trigger, into the crowd]."

== In high culture ==
High culture forms such as fine art and literature have aestheticized violence into a form of autonomous art. This concept of an aesthetic element of murder has a long history; in the 19th century, Thomas de Quincey wrote,

Everything in this world has two handles. Murder, for instance, may be laid hold of by its moral handle... and that, I confess, is its weak side; or it may also be treated aesthetically, as the Germans call it—that is, in relation to good taste.

In his 1991 study of romantic literature, University of Georgia literature professor Joel Black stated that "(if) any human act evokes the aesthetic experience of the sublime, certainly it is the act of murder". Black notes that "...if murder can be experienced aesthetically, the murderer can in turn be regarded as a kind of artist—a performance artist or anti-artist whose specialty is not creation but destruction."

== In films ==
Film critics analyzing violent film images that seek to aesthetically please the viewer mainly fall into two categories. Critics who see depictions of violence in film as superficial and exploitative argue that such films lead audience members to become desensitized to brutality, thus increasing their aggression. On the other hand, critics who view violence as a type of content, or as a theme, claim it is cathartic and provides "acceptable outlets for anti-social impulses". Adrian Martin describes the stance of such critics as emphasizing the separation between violence in film and real violence. To these critics, "movie violence is fun, spectacle, make-believe; it's dramatic metaphor, or a necessary catharsis akin to that provided by Jacobean theatre; it's generic, pure sensation, pure fantasy. It has its own changing history, its codes, its precise aesthetic uses."

Margaret Bruder, a film studies professor at Indiana University and the author of Aestheticizing Violence, or How to Do Things with Style, proposes that there is a distinction between aestheticized violence and the use of gore and blood in mass market action or war films. She argues that "aestheticized violence is not merely the excessive use of violence in a film". Movies such as the popular action film Die Hard 2 are very violent, but they do not qualify as examples of aestheticized violence because they are not "stylistically excessive in a significant and sustained way". Bruder argues that films such as such as Hard Target, True Romance and Tombstone employ aestheticized violence as a stylistic tool. In such films, "the stylized violence they contain ultimately serves as (...) another interruption in the narrative drive".

A Clockwork Orange is a 1971 film written, directed, and produced by Stanley Kubrick and based on the novel of the same name by Anthony Burgess. Set in a futuristic England (circa 1995, as imagined in 1965), it follows the life of a teenage gang leader named Alex. In Alexander Cohen's analysis of Kubrick's film, he argues that the ultra-violence of the young protagonist, Alex, "...represents the breakdown of culture itself". In the film, gang members are "...[s]eeking idle de-contextualized violence as entertainment" as an escape from the emptiness of their dystopian society. When the protagonist murders a woman in her home, Cohen states that Kubrick presents a "[s]cene of aestheticized death" by setting the murder in a room filled with "...modern art which depict scenes of sexual intensity and bondage"; as such, the scene depicts a "...struggle between high-culture which has aestheticized violence and sex into a form of autonomous art, and the very image of post-modern mastery".

Writing in The New York Times, Dwight Garner reviews the controversy and moral panic surrounding the 1991 novel and 2000 film American Psycho. Garner concludes that the film was a "coal-black satire" in which "dire comedy mixes with Grand Guignol. There's demented opera in some of its scenes." The book, meanwhile, has acquired "grudging respect" and has been compared to Anthony Burgess's A Clockwork Orange. Garner claims that the novel's author, Bret Easton Ellis, has contributed to the aestheticization of violence in popular media: "The culture has shifted to make room for [Patrick] Bateman. We've developed a taste for barbaric libertines with twinkling eyes and some zing in their tortured souls. Tony Soprano, Walter White from "Breaking Bad", Hannibal Lecter (who predates "American Psycho")—here are the most significant pop culture characters of the past 30 years... Thanks to these characters, and to first-person shooter video games, we've learned to identify with the bearer of violence and not just cower before him or her."

In Xavier Morales' review of Quentin Tarantino's Kill Bill: Volume 1, he calls the film "a groundbreaking aestheticization of violence". Morales argues that, similarly to A Clockwork Orange, the film's use of aestheticized violence appeals to audiences as an aesthetic element, and thus subverts preconceptions of what is acceptable or entertaining.

== See also ==
- Abjection
- Aestheticization of politics
- Anti-hero
- Art of murder
- Gladiator
- Graphic violence
- Moral panic
- Violence and video games
