= Oxford Standard for Citation of Legal Authorities =

UK legal citation style guide

The Oxford University Standard for Citation of Legal Authorities (OSCOLA) is a style guide that provides the modern method of legal citation in the United Kingdom; the style itself is also referred to as OSCOLA. First developed by Peter Birks of the University of Oxford Faculty of Law, and now in its 5th edition (2026, Hart Publishing, ISBN 978-1-50997-369-9), it has been adopted by most law schools and many legal publishers in the United Kingdom. An online supplement (developed for the third edition) is available for the citation of international legal cases, not covered in the main guide.

== Cases ==
Cases are to be cited with as little punctuation as possible in the names or the report names. If there is a neutral citation, which is generally the case after 2001 or 2002, it should be cited before the "best" report: in England and Wales these are the Law Reports (AC, QB, Ch etc.), or the WLR or the All ER, after a comma.

- Carlill v Carbolic Smoke Ball Co [1893] 1 QB 256
- Transfield Shipping Inc v Mercator Shipping Inc (The Achilleas) [2008] UKHL 48, [2009] 1 AC 61

The year is put in square brackets if the report uses dates to identify volumes; otherwise round brackets give the date of the judgment. For example, the All England Reports are identified by year then volume, meaning they should be cited as, for example, "[2005] 1 All ER".

When something is cited for a second time, an abbreviation can be used. In a footnote referring back to a particular page and another footnote, this would be,

- Carlill (n 12) 854
- The Achilleas (n 13) [12]

This parenthetical reference to a prior note or page may be disrupted if an editor inserts a new reference in the article before the reference of the parenthetical.

For European Union cases,

- Case 240/83 Procureur de la République v ADBHU [1985] ECR 531

For European Court of Human Rights cases,

- Omojudi v UK (2009) 51 EHRR 10

== Journals and books ==
Journal articles, books etc. should be cited with the author's name as shown in the work being cited. If a journal title is abbreviated, it should follow the guide in the appendix, which includes some standard abbreviations including specific journals, law reports and some authoritative books (e.g. J for Journal, Crim for Criminal, Bl Comm for Blackstone's Commentaries on the Laws of England); in all cases the abbreviations do not have full stops. If the journal does not have consecutive volume numbers, the year should be shown in square brackets, as in the second example.

- Alison L Young, 'In Defence of Due Deference' (2009) 72 MLR 554
- Paul Craig, 'Theory, "Pure Theory" and Values in Public Law' [2005] PL 440

Books follow a similar pattern. Note the order is Author, Title (Edition, Publisher Year) page.

- Joseph Raz, The Authority of Law: Essays on Law and Morality (2nd edn, OUP 2009)

If a title and a subtitle have nothing in between, a colon should be used to separate them. A chapter in an edited book would be cited as follows.

- Justine Pila, 'The Value of Authorship in the Digital Environment' in William H Dutton and Paul W Jeffreys (eds), World Wide Research: Reshaping the Sciences and Humanities in the Century of Information (MIT Press 2000)

== Legislation ==
UK legislation should be cited by short title, always written in roman with the year at the end, with no comma before it. The section is abbreviated with no full stops.

- Employment Rights Act 1996, s 86(1)(a)

Older statutes (e.g. those for which no official short title exists) may be cited by regnal year and chapter where this is considered helpful.

- Crown Debts Act 1801 (41 Geo 3 c 90)

EU legislation should be as follows.

- Council Directive 2001/29/EC of 22 May 2001 on the harmonisation of certain aspects of copyright and related rights in the information society [2001] OJ L167/10

== Hansard and parliamentary reports ==
Parliamentary debates are cited by reference to Hansard date, volume and column. Debates in Parliament are cited "HC Deb" or "HL Deb" for the Commons and Lords respectively, while committee debates use the name of the committee in roman, followed by the title of the report in italics. As with other citations, number ranges should be abbreviated to as few digits as possible, to a minimum of two.

- HC Deb 3 February 1977, vol 389, cols 973–76
- Joint Committee on Human Rights, Legislative Scrutiny: Equality Bill (second report); Digital Economy Bill (2009–10, HL 73, HC 425) 14–16

== See also ==
- Citation of United Kingdom legislation
- The Bluebook: a Uniform System of Citation
- ALWD Guide to Legal Citation
- Case citation
