= Bluebook =

Style guide on legal citation

The Bluebook
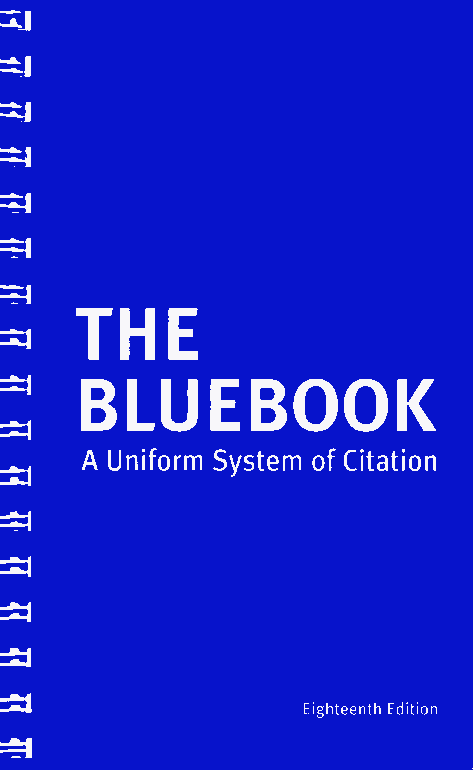
- Cover of the 18th edition
- Subject: Legal citations
- Published: 1926–present
- Publisher: Harvard Law Review; Columbia Law Review; University of Pennsylvania Law Review; Yale Law Journal
- ISBN: 979-8-218-57457-4
- Website: legalbluebook.com

The Bluebook: A Uniform System of Citation is a style guide that prescribes the most widely used legal citation system in the United States. It is taught and used at a majority of law schools in the United States and is also used in a majority of federal courts. Legal publishers also use several "house" citation styles in their works.

The Bluebook is compiled by the Harvard Law Review, Columbia Law Review, Yale Law Journal, and University of Pennsylvania Law Review. Currently, it is in its 22nd edition (published May 2025). Its name was first used for the 6th edition (1939). Opinions have differed regarding its origins at Yale and Harvard Law Schools, with the latter long claiming credit.

The Supreme Court uses its own unique citation style in its opinions, even though most of the justices and their law clerks obtained their legal education at law schools that use The Bluebook. Furthermore, many state courts have their own citation rules that take precedence over the guide for documents filed with those courts. Some of the local rules are simple modifications to The Bluebook system. Delaware's Supreme Court has promulgated rules of citation for unreported cases markedly different from its standards, and custom in that state as to the citation format of the Delaware Uniform Citation code also differs from it. In other states, the local rules differ from The Bluebook in that they use their own style guides. Attorneys in those states must be able to switch seamlessly between citation styles depending upon whether their work product is intended for a federal or state court. California has allowed citations in Bluebook as well as the state's own style manual, but many practitioners and courts continue recommending the California Style Manual.

An online-subscription version of The Bluebook was launched in 2008. A mobile version was launched in 2012 within the Rulebook app, which enables access for legal professionals to federal or state court rules, codes, and style manuals on iPads and other mobile devices.

== Elements ==
The 22nd edition of The Bluebook governs the style and formatting of various references and elements of a legal publication, including:

- Structure and use of citations
- Typefaces for law reviews
- Subdivisions
- Short citation forms (for use when a document makes multiple references to the same case)
- Quotations
- Abbreviations, numerals, and symbols
- Italicization for style and in unique circumstances
- Capitalization
- Titles of judges, officials, and terms of court
- Cases
- Constitutions
- Statutes
- Legislative materials
- Administrative and executive materials
- Books, reports, and other nonperiodic materials
- Periodical materials
- Unpublished and forthcoming sources
- Electronic media and other nonprint resources
- Services
- Foreign materials
- International materials

== History ==
While legal citation manuals go as far back as Modus Legendi Abbreviaturas in Utroque Iure, published around 1475, there were very few examples prior to the 20th century; law professor Byron D. Cooper mentions only a few short articles: "Rules for Citation" (The American Law Review, 1896) and "Methods of Citing Statute Law" (Ruppenthal, Law Library Journal, 1919). The Uniform System of Citations thus became a "pioneer" manual.

According to Harvard, the origin of The Bluebook was a pamphlet for proper citation forms for articles in the Harvard Law Review written by its editor, Erwin Griswold. However, according to a 2016 study by two Yale librarians, Harvard's claim is incorrect. They trace the origin of The Bluebook to a 1920 publication by Karl Llewellyn at Yale on how to write law journal materials for the Yale Law Journal. The authors point out that some of the material in the 1926 first edition of The Bluebook (as well as that in a 1922 Harvard precursor to it published as Instructions for Editorial Work) duplicate material in the 1920 Llewellen booklet and its 1921 successor, a blue pamphlet that the Yale Law Journal published as Abbreviations and Form of Citation.

For several years before the first edition of The Bluebook appeared, Yale, Columbia, and several other law journals "worked out a tentative citation plan", but Harvard initially opposed it "because of skepticism as to the results to be attained and in part because of a desire not to deviate from our forms especially at the solicitation of other Reviews". Eventually, Harvard reversed course and joined the coalition by 1926. According to Judge Henry J. Friendly, "Attorney General [Herbert] Brownell … and I and two others [from Columbia and Pennsylvania] were the authors of the first edition of the Bluebook." Friendly has also sometimes been considered the creator of The Bluebook.

The cover of the 1926 A Uniform System of Citation was green. The color was "brown from the second (1928) edition through the fifth (1936) edition. It was only with the sixth (1939) edition that it became blue." In 1939, the cover of the book was changed from brown to a "more patriotic blue", allegedly to avoid comparison with a color associated with Nazi Germany. The eleventh edition, published in 1967, was actually white with a blue border. The cover color returned to blue in the twelfth edition of 1976.

The full text of the first (1926) through the fifteenth (1991) editions is available on the official website.

The Bluebook uses two different styles. Practitioners use the first in preparing court documents and memoranda, while the second is used primarily in academic settings, such as law reviews and journals. The latter uses specific formatting to identify types of references, such as the use of small caps for books, newspapers, and law reviews. A rule of thumb used by many is to see if the formatting can be reproduced on a typewriter—if so, practitioners use it, if it requires typesetting, it is used for academic articles.

By 2011, The Bluebook was "the main guide and source of authority" on legal references for the past 90 years. It is recognized as the "gold standard" for legal references in the United States, even though it was originally designed only to help teach law students how to cite cases and other legal material. Although other citation systems exist, they have limited acceptance, and in general, The Bluebook is followed in the legal citation as the most widely accepted citation style, called the "Bible", the "final arbiter", even the legal citation "Kama Sutra". Some states have adopted The Bluebook in full, while others have partially adopted The Bluebook. States such as Texas have supplements, such as The Greenbook, that merely address citation issues unique to Texas and otherwise follow The Bluebook.

== Variations ==
=== Federal ===
The Solicitor General issues a style guide that is designed to supplement The Bluebook. This guide focuses on citation for practitioners, such as restraining law reviews to two typefaces: normal and italics. Other changes are similarly minor, such as moving supra from before the page referenced to after the page number. The guide does state that unless explicitly specified otherwise, The Bluebook rule takes precedence in the event of conflict.

=== State ===
California used to require use of the California Style Manual. In 2008, the California Supreme Court issued a rule giving an option of using either the California Style Manual or The Bluebook. The two styles are significantly different in citing cases, in use of ibid. or id. (for idem), and in citing books and journals. Michigan uses a separate official citation system issued as an administrative order of the Michigan Supreme Court. The primary difference is that the Michigan system "omits all periods in citations, uses italics somewhat differently, and does not use 'small caps.'" As noted above, Texas merely supplements The Bluebook with items that are unique to Texas courts, such as citing cases when Texas was an independent republic, petition and writ history, and Attorney General Opinions.

== Reception ==
=== Criticism of Bluebook's prolixity ===
At over 500 pages for the 19th edition, The Bluebook is significantly more complicated than the citation systems used by most other fields. Legal scholars have called for its replacement with a simpler system. The University of Chicago uses the simplified Maroonbook, and even simpler systems are in use by other parties.

During his tenure on the United States Court of Appeals for the Seventh Circuit, Judge Richard Posner repeatedly criticized the Bluebook. In 1986, he wrote the article "Goodbye to the Bluebook," hoping that the Maroonbook would quickly overtake it. In 2011, he wrote the article "The Bluebook Blues," lamenting that the Bluebook remained dominant despite its increasing complexity, while providing the 885-word citation manual used among his law clerks.

=== BabyBlue copyright controversy ===
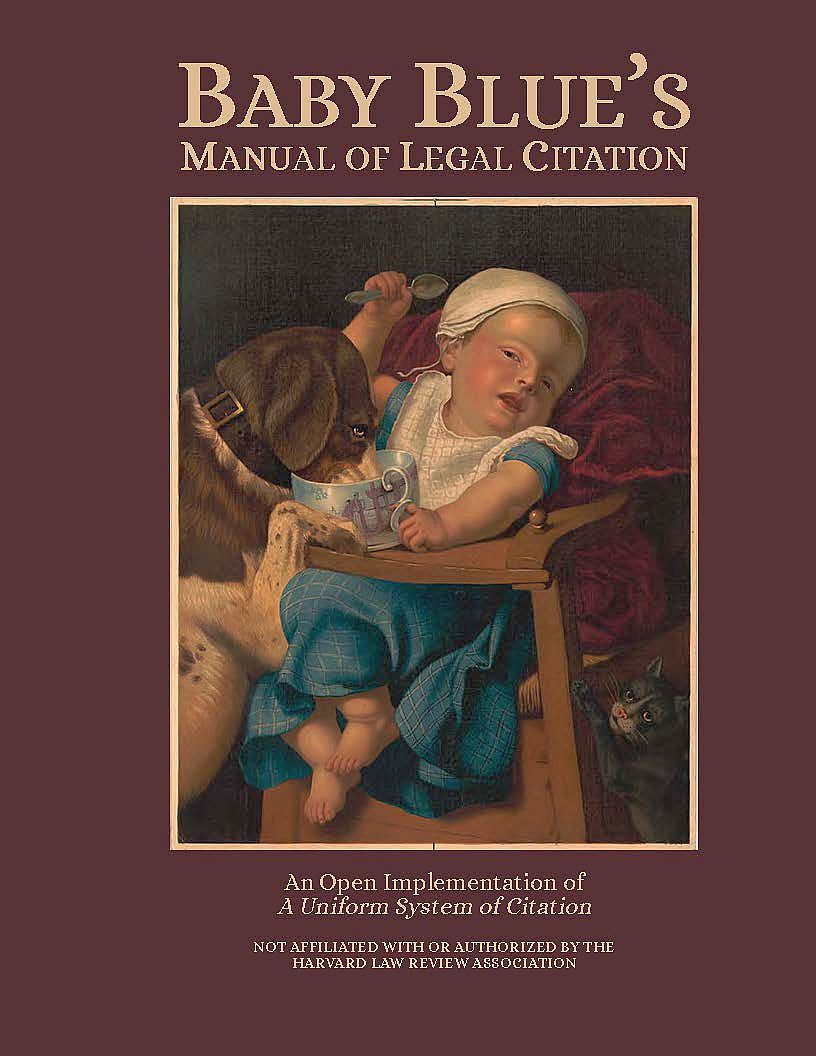
Cover of BabyBlue

Cover of The Indigo Book

Another dispute is over the copyright status of The Bluebook. Open-source advocates claim that The Bluebook is not protected under copyright because it is a critical piece of legal infrastructure. Lawyers who represent the Bluebook publishing consortium claim that the "carefully curated examples, explanations and other textual materials" are protected by copyright.

A group led by Professor Christopher J. Sprigman at NYU Law School prepared a "public-domain implementation of the Bluebook's Uniform System of Citation," which his group calls BabyBlue. However, in 2015, a law firm (Ropes & Gray) representing the Harvard Law Review Association (HLRA) sent him a letter stating:

[W]e believe that BabyBlue may include content identical or substantially similar to content or other aspects of The Bluebook that constitute original works of authorship protected by copyright, and which are covered by various United States copyright registrations. …

[M]y client has been and remains concerned that the publication and promotion of such a work may infringe the Reviews' copyright rights in The Bluebook and The Bluebook Online, and may cause substantial, irreparable harm to the Reviews and their rights and interests in those works. …

[I]t is our client's position that the title BabyBlue, or any title consisting of or comprising the word "Blue", when used on or in connection with your work, would so resemble the BLUEBOOK Marks as to be likely, to cause confusion, mistake, and/or deception…Accordingly, and to avoid any risk of consumer confusion, my client respectfully demands that you agree (i) not to use the title or name BabyBlue, or any other title or name including the word "blue", for your work.

In response to the HLRA letter to Sprigman, over 150 students, faculty, staff, and alumni of Harvard Law School signed a petition supporting BabyBlue. Yale and NYU students added their separate petitions supporting BabyBlue. A posting in the Harvard Law Record commented:

The intellectual property claims that the HLR Association made may or may not be spurious. But independent of that, the tactics employed by the HLR Association's counsel in dealing with Mr. Malamud and Prof. Sprigman are deplorable. The Harvard Law Review claims to be an organization that promotes knowledge and access to legal scholarship. It is a venerated part of the traditions of Harvard Law School. But these actions by the Harvard Law Review speak of competition and not of justice.

The posting also suggested that HLRA should "redirect the money it spends on legal fees ($185,664 in 2013)" to a more worthy purpose. David Post commented: "It's copyright nonsense, and Harvard should be ashamed of itself for loosing its legal hounds to dispense it in order to protect its (apparently fairly lucrative) publication monopoly." On March 31, 2016, it was announced that the project had changed its name to The Indigo Book.

== Financial controversy ==
For the first 50 years of the Bluebook's history, the Harvard Law Review kept 100 percent of the revenues. In 1974, the editors of the Columbia and University of Pennsylvania Law Reviews and the Yale Law Journal apparently discovered this due to an indiscretion. They complained that Harvard was illegally keeping all profits from the first eleven editions, estimated to total $20,000 per year. After they threatened to sue, Harvard agreed to split the revenue: 40 percent for Harvard, 20 percent each for Columbia, Pennsylvania, and Yale; Harvard would continue to provide the production and distribution services.

The law reviews have not disclosed the revenues of the Bluebook themselves, but revenues from the sale of the Bluebook have been estimated "in the millions of dollars". A 2022 review of the Harvard Law Review's non-profit disclosures found that the Bluebook had made $1.2 million in profits in 2020, with The Harvard Law Review taking an 8.5% cut of profits for administrative services and the remainder split equally among the four law reviews. Profits from the Bluebook totaled $16 million between 2011 and 2020. Excluding the University of Pennsylvania Law Review, the law review's endowments total $59.4 million.

== See also ==
- Australian Guide to Legal Citation
- Canadian Guide to Uniform Legal Citation
- Case citation
- Legal citation signals
- Oxford Standard for Citation of Legal Authorities (OSCOLA; UK)

== Sources ==
- Cooper, Byron D. (1982). "Anglo-American Legal Citation: Historical Development and Library Implications". Law Library Journal. 75 (3): 1745–.
