= ALWD Guide to Legal Citation =

ALWD Citation Manual

ALWD Guide to Legal Citation, formerly ALWD Citation Manual, is a style guide providing a legal citation system for the United States, compiled by the Association of Legal Writing Directors. Its first edition was published in 2000, under editor Darby Dickerson. Its seventh edition, under editor Carolyn V. Williams, was released in May 2021 by Aspen Publishing. The ALWD Guide to Legal Citation is published as a spiral-bound book as well as an online version.

It primarily competes with the Bluebook style, a system developed and still updated by law reviews students at Harvard, Yale, University of Pennsylvania, and Columbia. Citations in the two formats are essentially identical. ALWD primarily focuses on citations for legal and court documents while the Bluebook focuses on academic writing, although both manuals provide citation guidance for both kinds of writing.

== Adoption ==
Three U.S. jurisdictions have adopted ALWD:

- United States Court of Appeals for the Eleventh Circuit
  - This court accepts citations in either ALWD or Bluebook format, but also requires that citations to United States Supreme Court decisions provide both official "U.S." and West's "S.Ct." citations, when available.
- United States District Court for the District of Montana
  - This court specifically accepts either ALWD or Bluebook.
- United States Bankruptcy Court, Montana
  - This court accepts any "nationally recognized citation form", and specifically names the ALWD Citation Manual. It does not mention Bluebook by name, but given its national recognition (it is the dominant legal style guide in the United States), it should be accepted.

In addition to those, some law schools and paralegal schools have fully adopted ALWD. Law journals such as Animal Law, NAELA, and Legal Writing have also adopted ALWD. However, a lack of reliable or recent data does not appear to exist regarding school usage.

== See also ==
- The Bluebook: A Uniform System of Citation
- Oxford Standard for Citation of Legal Authorities (OSCOLA)
- Case citation
