= Authority (textual criticism) =

Reliability of a text as a witness

The authority of a text is its reliability as a witness to the author's intentions. These intentions could be initial, medial or final, but intentionalist editors (most notably represented by Fredson Bowers and G. Thomas Tanselle editing school) generally attempt to retrieve final authorial intentions. The concept is of particular importance for textual critics, whether they believe that authorial intention is recoverable, or whether they think that this recovery is impossible.

Here are some examples of authority:

- The only authority for the works of the Roman poet Catullus derives from a lost manuscript, of which three copies reside in the National Library in Paris, the Bodleian Library at Oxford, and the Vatican Library in Rome (the Codex Vaticanus). No one knows, or can ever know, how close this manuscript comes to Catullus' intentions—in other words, how great its authority is.
- It is generally thought that the Q1 ('bad quarto') edition of Shakespeare's Hamlet is an unauthorized copy, reconstructed from memory by one of the actors. If this is so, then it has some authority, but much less than the first authorized quarto, Q2 (1602). In comparison, however, it might be a useful authority to the cuts and adaptations made in the performance it was based on.
- The First Folio edition of Julius Caesar (1623) is the only authoritative source, since it is the copy-text of all future editions.
- A diary which is probably authentic has total authority.

A text's authority is made more problematic when it has more than one author, when it falsely asserts itself to be someone else's work, or when it is revised many times. For instance:

- The forged diaries of Adolf Hitler have no authority as the work of their supposed author, but they do have authority as a witness to the intentions of Konrad Kujau, the forger.
- A page on Wikipedia could be said to indicate the intentions of the aggregate of users who have edited it up to that point: it has multiple authority. But many of its editors will disagree with one another about what the page should contain. The idea of 'final intention' does not easily apply, since the page is never complete, and since a recent change (e.g. a piece of vandalism) might not be satisfactory to any of the other editors except the one who made it.
- The quarto edition of Shakespeare's King Lear differs from the later folio edition in many ways. Most modern versions collate the two, preferring one edition in one passage and the other in another. But some editors, such as Stanley Wells, argue they are separate works with different artistic intentions, and that neither of them has more authority.

Authority can also be related to a particular edition, especially if this edition reaches a degree of popularity.

== See also ==
- Argument from authority
- Historical criticism
- Source criticism
- Textual criticism
