= McGill Faculty of Law =

Law school of McGill University

Coordinates: 45.50321°N 73.58058°W

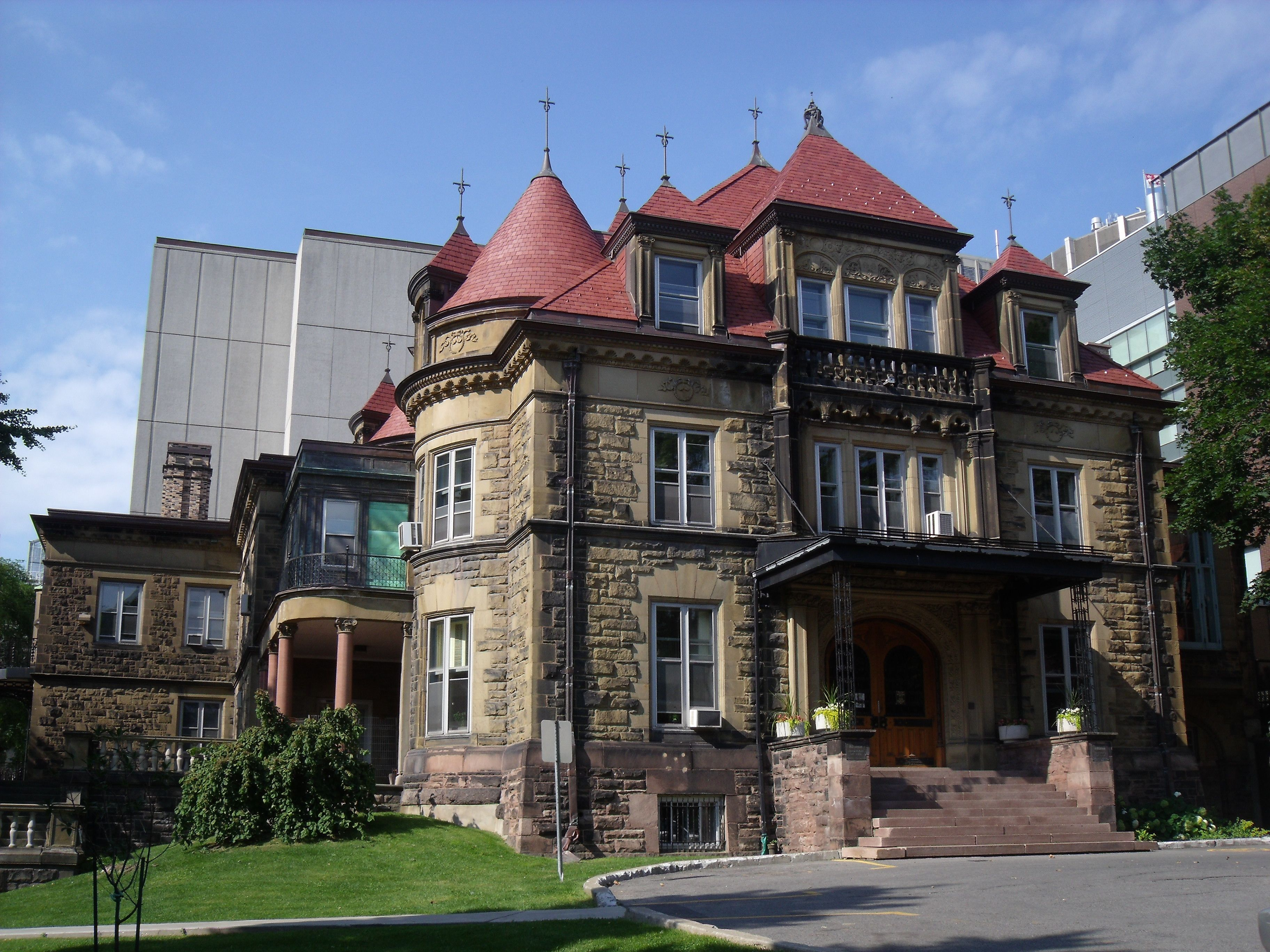
- Old Chancellor Day Hall (foreground) and New Chancellor Day Hall (background)
- Parent school: McGill University
- Established: 1848; 178 years ago
- School type: Public law school
- Parent endowment: CA$2.495 billion
- Dean: Tina Piper
- Location: Montreal, Quebec, Canada
- Enrollment: 895
- Faculty: 109
- Website: www.mcgill.ca/law/

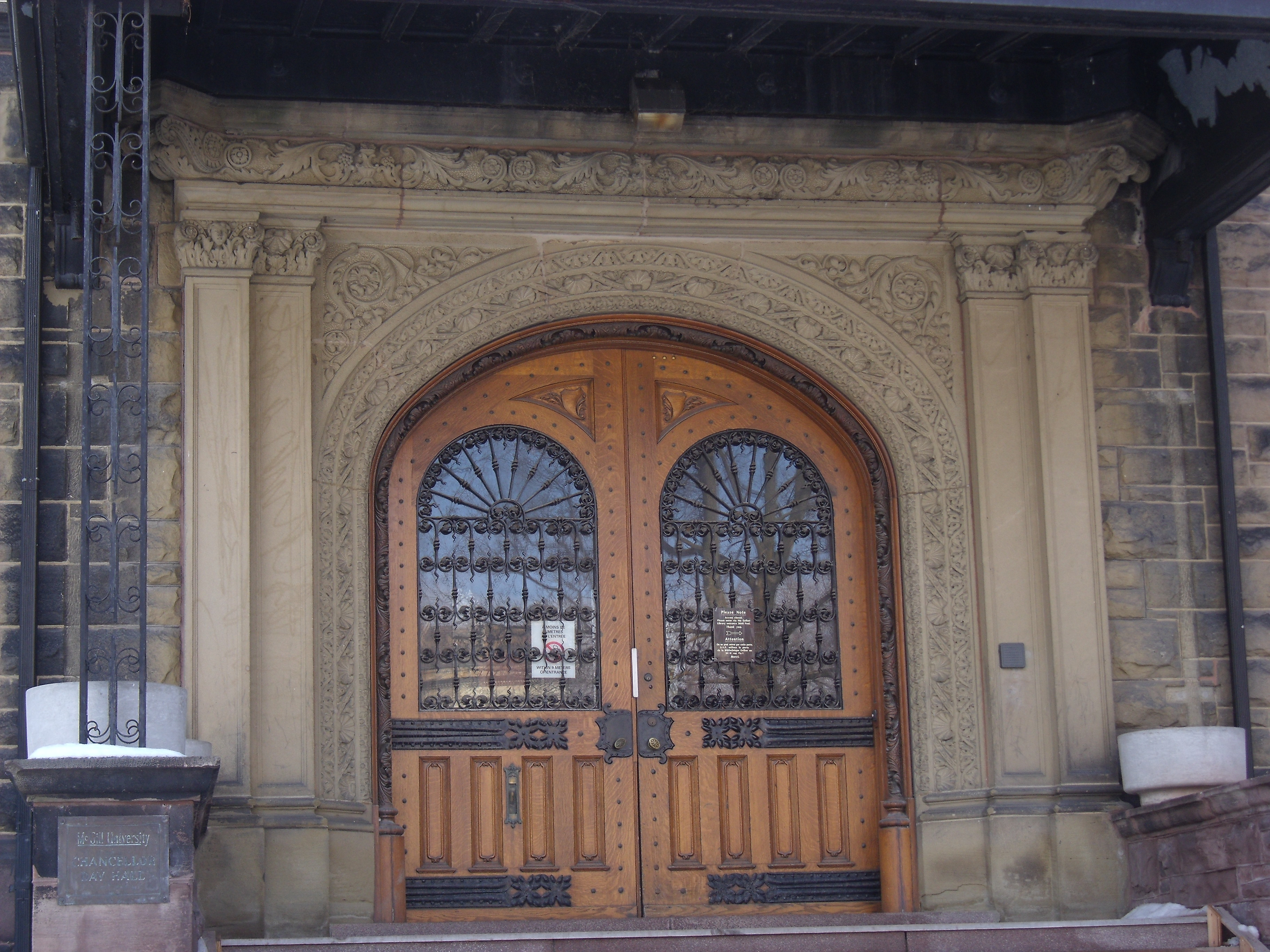
Entrance to Chancellor Day Hall

The McGill Faculty of Law is one of the professional graduate schools of McGill University in Montreal, Quebec, Canada. It is the oldest law school in Canada. 180 candidates are admitted for any given academic year. For the year 2021 class, the acceptance rate was 10%.

Notable alumni include prime ministers John Abbott and Sir Wilfrid Laurier, thirteen Justices of the Supreme Court (Including the most recent appointments, Mahmud Jamal and Nicholas Kasirer), as well as Members of Parliament. Marc Miller, a current member of the Canadian House of Commons and a current minister of the Cabinet of Canada, is a graduate from the faculty.

== Academics ==
=== Bachelor of Civil Law and Juris Doctor program ===
The McGill Faculty of Law offers a unique combined Bachelor of Civil Law (BCL) and Juris Doctor (JD) program. The BCL/JD program emphasizes a transsystemic and polyjural approach that integrates common law and civil law, sometimes within a single class. More recently, the faculty has incorporated Indigenous law into its curriculum in response to the Truth and Reconciliation Commission's recommendations for Canadian law schools.

In 2016, the faculty reviewed its curriculum and added Integration Week: an introductory week of group work and lectures for first-year students. They also added two Focus Weeks—one in fall and one in winter—that allow students to take intensive one-week courses. In winter 2023, the first student seminar on Abolitionist practices and Transformative Justice was launched.

The duration of BCL/JD program is somewhat flexible: the program can be completed in 3, 3.5, or 4 years. Students who opt for a minor, major, or honours program generally require 4 years to complete their degree. Majors are offered in International Human Rights and Development and in Commercial Negotiation and Dispute Resolution.

The Faculty of Law, in collaboration with the Desautels Faculty of Management and the Faculty of Art's School of Social Work, offers joint programs that combine the BCL/JD program with either a Master of Business Administration (MBA) or a Master of Social Work (MSW). A joint program takes 4 to 5 years to complete.

The Faculty of Law's Admissions Office has an acceptance rate of 15.9%.

=== Master of Laws (LLM) ===
The faculty offers four LLM programs for students: one general LLM program, and three specialized LLM programs in Air and Space Law, Environment, and Bioethics. Except for the LLM Bioethics program, all programs have thesis and non-thesis options. The non-thesis Master's of Law option prioritizes course work and can be completed in twelve months. The thesis option prioritizes research; it can be completed in sixteen to twenty-four months. Student in the LLM Bioethics program write a thesis.

=== Doctor of Civil Law (DCL) ===
The faculty offers three DCL programs in General Law, Comparative Law, and Air and Space Law. Students generally complete the DCL program in 3 to 4 years.

=== Graduate certificates ===
The faculty offers graduate certificates in Comparative Law and in Air and Space Law. Graduate certificates are awarded upon completing a set number of credits. Certificates are based on coursework, and no thesis is required.

== History ==
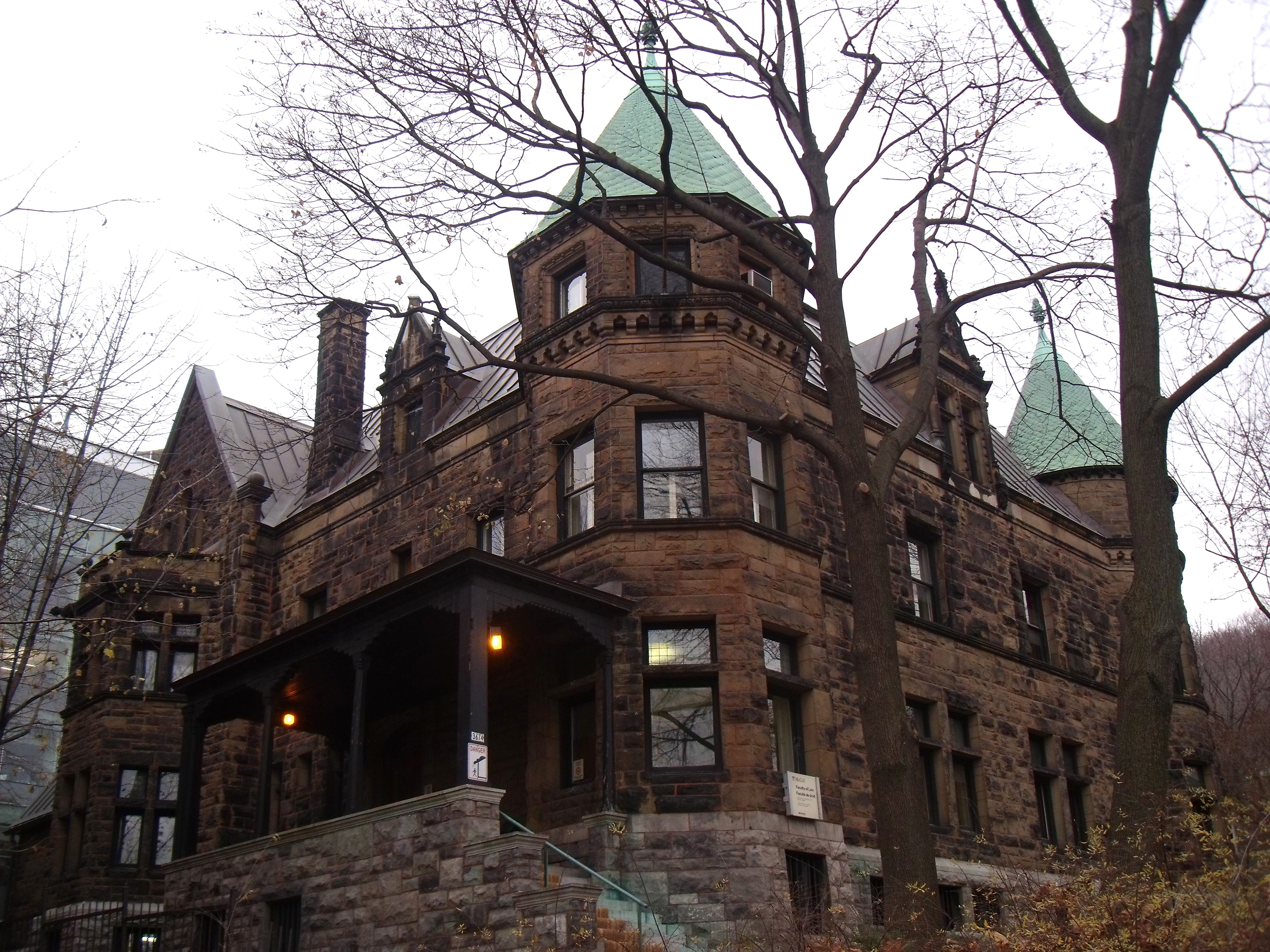
Angus McIntyre House

The Faculty of Law was officially created in 1853, after a petition signed by young men studying law in Montreal was made to McGill in 1848. With the incoming class of 1969, the faculty added a stand-alone common law degree, suitable to the practice of law in other Canadian provinces, which could be taken individually or jointly with the traditional Civil Law curriculum. The joint degree was then referred to as the National Programme, and taught common law and civil law in separate courses, but combined their study in a year-long introductory "Foundations" course and in some upper-year seminars. In 1951, McGill inaugurated its first post-graduate law program with the creation of its Institute of Air & Space Law. The institute was founded by John Cobb Cooper, who had served as a senior official in Pan American World Airways, and the International Air Transport Association. Canada's only United Nations organ, the International Civil Aviation Organization, is also headquartered in Montreal.

With the incoming class of 1999, the faculty eliminated its civil, common, and national programs, and replaced them with a single program, which includes some mandatory first-year courses and some upper-year courses which integrate both common and civil law. This joint and bilingual degree, which all students must take, is now referred to as the transsystemic program. This program underwent slight revisions during a curriculum renewal unrolled in 2016. Under the newly revised program, criminal and property law are taught differently; incoming students also undergo two "integration weeks" (one in the fall and winter).

The Transsystemic program was created under the direction of former Dean Stephen Toope, whereby every student graduates with degrees in both civil law and common law. This means that, from the first year, courses now explore civil and common law concepts in close comparison. Students analyse and critically evaluate the two traditions, their histories, and their social, political, and cultural contexts. Undergraduate students may participate in international exchange programs, and in the International Courts and Tribunals Program, which in 2006 received a Scotiabank-AUCC Award for Excellence in Internationalization.

Since 1976, the Faculty of Law's Institute of Air and Space Law, has annually published the first and only bilingual journal in the field of air and space law, the Annals of Air and Space Law. Other Faculty of Law bilingual publications include the McGill Law Journal and the McGill Journal of Sustainable Development Law.

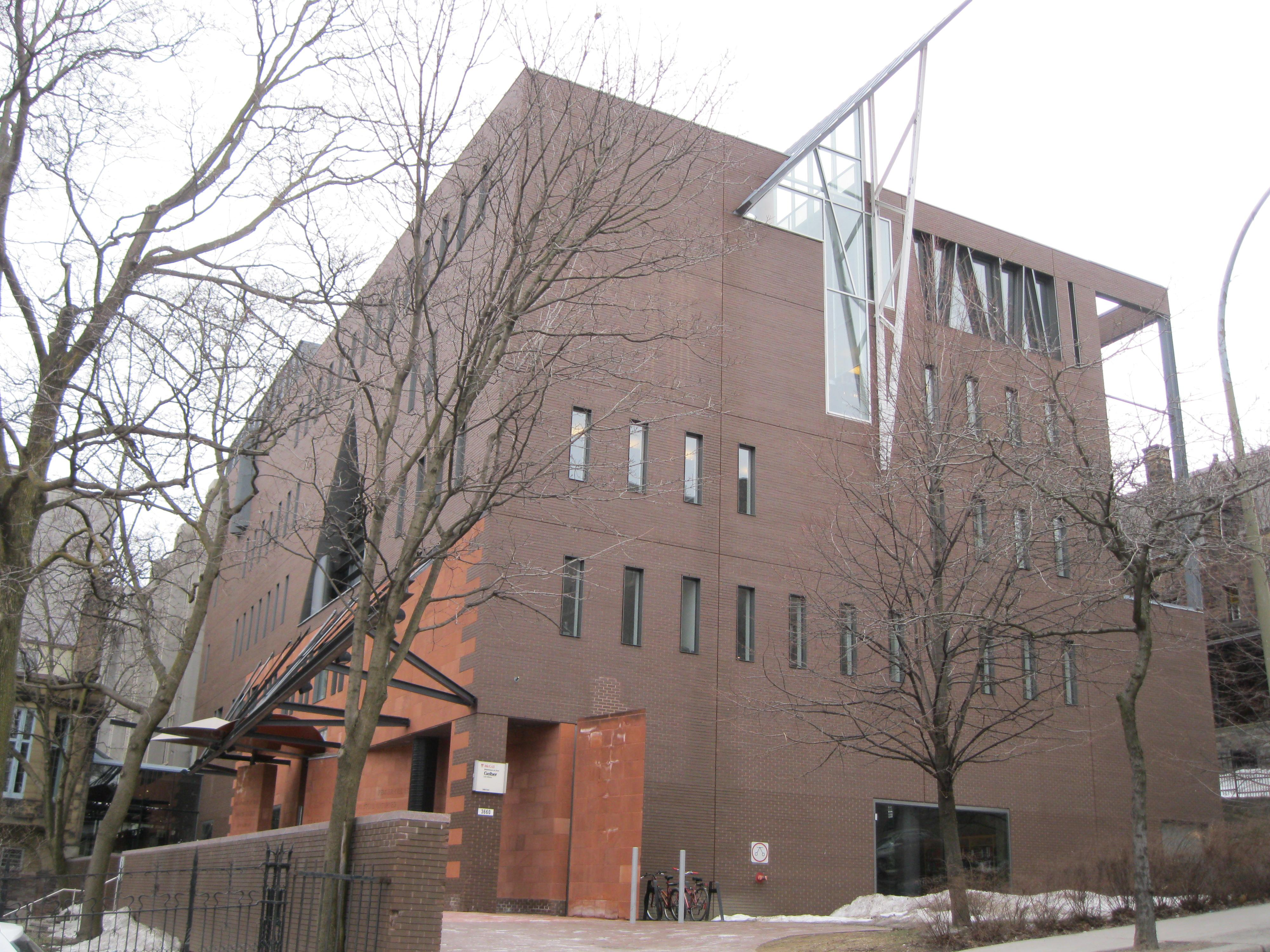
Nahum Gelber Law Library (side profile)

== The Buildings ==
Old Chancellor Day Hall and New Chancellor Day Hall are the names of two joined buildings at McGill University's downtown campus that house the Faculty of Law. Old Chancellor Day Hall was designed by noted architect Bruce Price for businessman James Ross. New Chancellor Day Hall was completed in 1967 by architecture firm Bland, Lemoyne, Edwards, and Shine. The Old and New Chancellor Day buildings are connected by an underground passage and by an atrium, which also connects to the Nahum Gelber Law Library. Old Chancellor Day Hall is used for administrative and faculty offices. New Chancellor Day Hall includes all classrooms, a moot court room, student spaces, law student services, and administrative and faculty offices.

=== Old Chancellor Day Hall ===
In 1892, Canadian civil engineer, businessman, and philanthropist James Ross hired architect Bruce Price (whose other masterworks included Windsor Station and Château Frontenac) to design a château-style mansion in Montreal's Golden Square Mile, on Peel Street. Built largely of yellow sandstone from New Brunswick, the James Ross House was one of the most expensive private homes built in Canada during the nineteenth century. The house was a social centre for the Golden Square Mile.

His son John Kenneth Leveson Ross, a noted bon vivant and sportsman, inherited both the house and the Ross fortune. In the 1919, J. K. L. Ross hired architects Trowbridge and Livingstone to undertake $600,000 of renovations that affected every room in the house. The renovation included adding a private bathroom to each bedroom, covering up a skylight, and adding windows to create a library/reading room in what is now the Common Room. John Ross declared bankruptcy in 1928, and the James Ross House was sold at auction in 1929 for a mere $51,000. The mansion was purchased by J. W. McConnell in 1948 as a gift to McGill University.

While the university may have initially planned to use it for a student residence, the Faculty of Law officially moved into the mansion in a ceremony attended by many members of the judiciary and the Montreal Bar on 9 February 1950. At the ceremony, McGill's chancellor, Orville S. Tyndale, declared on behalf of the Board of Governors that the mansion would be named Chancellor Day Hall in honour of McGill's first chancellor, Charles Dewey Day. The opening ceremony was held in the students' handsomely furnished common room, a gift from Maurice Pollack.

On 9 July 2014, Old Chancellor Day Hall closed for 14 months for renovations to upgrade the building's heating, electrical systems, plumbing, windows, and more. Thirty-four staff and faculty members were relocated to New Chancellor Day Hall and to temporary offices on McGill College Avenue.

In December 2017, representatives of the Clan Ross Association of Canada and members of the Faculty of Law unveiled a plaque commemorating James Ross. The plaque is located near the main entrance.

=== New Chancellor Day Hall ===
New Chancellor Day Hall was built in 1967 to address the Faculty of Law's growing program and increased enrolment. A six-storey precast concrete tower designed by architectural firm Bland, Lemoyne, Edwards, and Shine was erected just west of Chancellor Day Hall and connected to it by a corridor, at the cost of $1.825 million. This extension was named New Chancellor Day Hall and blended with the adjacent Stewart Biological Sciences Building. New Chancellor Day Hall included additional classrooms, study spaces, and a moot court. Prior to the construction of the Gelber Law Library, the top floors of New Chancellor Day Hall housed the library.

The building was inaugurated on 21 January 1967. During the bilingual ceremony, the Faculty of Law awarded seven honorary degrees, including degrees to Chief Justice Robert Taschereau of Canada, Chief Justice Earl Warren of the United States, and Lord Denning of Great Britain. Following the inauguration of the Gelber Law Library in 1998, the empty floors of New Chancellor Day that had previously been used as the library were used by McGill University to house various small research units attached to different faculties. In 2005, all student services at the Faculty of Law were consolidated on the fourth floor of New Chancellor Day Hall.

From 2008 to 2009, New Chancellor Day Hall underwent major renovations. The project overhauled the third, fifth, and sixth floors. New architectural features included adding a massive skylight above a staircase between the fifth and sixth floors, piercing windows on the sixth floor, and creating partially frosted glass partitions between offices to allow natural light inside interior offices. The third floor is devoted to student spaces, accommodating a multimedia classroom with movable walls and a seminar room. The third floor is also home to multiple student clubs, student-run law journals, and the graduate students' lounge. The fifth and sixth floors feature a conference room, and house some of the Faculty's research units, as well as offices for professors, staff, graduate students, and visiting scholars.

=== Nahum Gelber Law Library ===
The Nahum Gelber Law Library is one of the 13 branches of the McGill University Library and houses over 220,000 volumes of statutes, regulations, law reports, treatises, books, journals and other legal material. Designed by Dan Hanganu, the Nahum Gelber Law Library was inaugurated September 1998. The building was designed to link to New and Old Chancellor Day Halls via a two-level atrium for socializing and studying.

The Gelber Library is home to the Wainwright Collection, which was established in 1958 with the acquisition of several hundred volumes dedicated to the history of French law. The collection is primarily composed of early French jurists on general civil law before the Codification of 1804 and was the personal library of French legal historian François Olivier-Martin. Over the years, the Wainwright fund has allowed the Library to expand the collection beyond the classic vision of civil law, centred on France, to reflect the global influence of civil law across languages and continents. Today, the collection consists of 800 works comprising 1200 volumes and is conserved in controlled atmospheric conditions in the Peter M. Laing Room, located on the second floor of the Gelber Law Library.

== Reputation ==
University rankings

World rankings
- QS World: 30
- THE World: 33

Canadian rankings

Graduates of the faculty consistently account for one quarter of Canada's Supreme Court clerkships, more than any law school in Canada. One of the small number of elite law schools internationally that may submit International Court of Justice (ICJ) clerkship applications, it also consistently places graduates at the ICJ, and has a better placement record than any other Canadian law school.

Its flagship law review, the McGill Law Journal, is the most cited law faculty review by Canada's Supreme Court, and was ranked the best overall student-run law journal in the world outside of the United States. It also publishes the Canadian Guide to Uniform Legal Citation, the standard reference work for almost all Canadian law reviews, Canadian law schools, and courts.

The McGill University Faculty of Law has consistently placed among the top three ranking law schools in Canada, and has historically placed in the top 35 law schools globally on multiple ranking systems. It was recently ranked the 30th best law school worldwide in the 2026 QS World University Rankings. It was ranked the 33rd best law school in the world in the 2025 Times Higher Education World University Rankings, marking consistent showings for McGill in the top 35 worldwide in the ranking. For the 2023 ranking, the Times Higher Education ranked the faculty the 17th best law school in the world.

In 2025, the McGill University Faculty of Law placed 2nd in the prestigious Willem C. Vis Moot International Competition, out of a total of 384 international law schools.

In 2023, the McGill University Faculty of Law had a 97.3% bar pass rate, the best rate in Quebec.

== Universal Declaration of Human Rights ==
McGill Law’s connection to the United Nations Universal Declaration of Human Rights (UDHR) is rooted in the work of McGill scholar John Peters Humphrey, who served as the principal drafter of early versions of the Declaration while affiliated with the United Nations. McGill now preserves his papers in the Humphrey fonds, which include early handwritten drafts, correspondence with Eleanor Roosevelt, lecture notes, and records of his human rights advocacy. In 2025, UNESCO inscribed the Humphrey Archives on its Memory of the World International Register, recognizing McGill’s foundational contribution to documenting the UDHR’s drafting history.

== Controversies ==
=== 2018 Student accessibility lawsuit ===
In 2018, the Faculty of Law and the McGill Office for Students with Disabilities were sued by a blind law student who alleged systematic denial of academic accommodation. The case was reported in local and national media outlets.

=== 2021–2024 Unionization and administrative controversy ===
After dissatisfaction with McGill University's handling of the COVID-19 pandemic and what professors described as centralized faculty governance, full-time professors at the Faculty of Law formed the Association of McGill Professors of Law (AMPL) and filed for certification with Quebec's Tribunal administratif du travail on November 7, 2021. McGill disputed the certification but lost before the Tribunal on November 8, 2022. Following continued delays in collective bargaining, AMPL members conducted a one-day strike on February 13, 2024, and later initiated an unlimited strike beginning April 24, 2024.

During the strike, Provost Christopher Manfredi inadvertently copied a law student and journalist on an internal email to President Deep Saini and Dean Robert Leckey, writing, "Are our students incapable of reading?" and that “I’m a bit worried about the people we’re sending into the legal profession.” The message, which appeared to question student ability amid widespread support for the strike, drew criticism from faculty and students. Manfredi apologized, though neither Saini nor Leckey publicly distanced themselves from the remarks. Later that summer, McGill announced graduation ceremonies for students without final grades due to the ongoing strike, prompting debate about compliance with university regulations.

=== 2024–2025 Faculty strike, labour disputes, and Bill 89 challenge ===
In 2024, professors in McGill’s Faculty of Law, represented by the Association of McGill Professors of Law (AMPL), began an unlimited strike following stalled bargaining and the university administration’s challenge to the union’s certification. The strike disrupted classes and grading for several weeks before being suspended on June 20, 2024, after McGill promised further negotiation dates in August. When McGill instead requested the Quebec Minister of Labour to impose arbitration and subsequently refused to negotiate, the union resumed its strike on August 26, 2024. On August 30, the Quebec Labour Tribunal ruled that McGill, Provost Christopher Manfredi, Vice-president Fabrice Labeau, and Dean Robert Leckey had prima facie violated the Quebec Labour Code by communicating directly with union members, and ordered McGill to cease such actions and post the ruling publicly.

In 2025, four certified faculty associations at McGill — including AMPL — filed a constitutional challenge in the Quebec Superior Court against Quebec’s Bill 89, provincial legislation expanding government powers to define “essential services” and limit strikes. Later that year, McGill dropped its separate legal challenge to the law-faculty union’s certification following renewed bargaining progress, effectively ending the dispute. These events generated class disruptions, court proceedings, and broader debate over academic labour rights and institutional autonomy in Canada.

== Notable people ==
=== Current faculty chair-holders and emeritus professors ===
- Adelle Blackett, holder of the Canada Research Chair in Transnational Labour Law and Development, former member of the International Labour Organization.
- Allison Christians, holder of the H. Heward Stikeman Chair in Tax Law.
- Bartha Knoppers Canadian law professor and an expert on the ethical aspects of genetics, genomics and biotechnology
- François Crépeau, former director of the Centre for Human Rights and Legal Pluralism, holder of the Hans and Tamar Oppenheimer Chair in Public International Law, and former United Nations Special Rapporteur on the Human Rights of Migrants.
- Helge Dedek, holder of the Arnold Wainwright Chair in Civil Law.
- Aaron Mills, holder of the Canada Research Chair in Indigenous Constitutionalism and Philosophy.
- Marc Gold, Canadian law professor and politician
- Stephen Allan Scott, professor emeritus and leading scholar on the Canadian Constitution.
- Colleen Sheppard, holder of the FR Scott Chair in Public & Constitutional Law.
- Daniel Weinstock, holder of the Katharine A. Pearson Chair in Civil Society and Public Policy.
- Peer Zumbansen, Business law professor, co-founder of the German Law Journal

=== Past faculty members ===
- Payam Akhavan, former UN prosecutor at The Hague.
- F. H. Buckley (LLB 1974), Foundation professor at George Mason University School of Law
- Irwin Cotler (BCL 1961, LLD 2019), human rights lawyer, former MP for Mount Royal and former Canadian Minister of Justice
- Julius Grey (BCL 1971), Quebec human rights lawyer
- Ralph Simmonds Justice of the Supreme Court of Western Australia
- Joseph Cohen, Member of the Legislative Assembly of Quebec for Montréal–Saint-Laurent
- John Cobb Cooper (LLD 1952), founded the Institute of Air & Space Law at McGill University in 1951
- Paul-André Crépeau, responsible for drafting the new Civil Code of Quebec
- Armand de Mestral, Jean Monnet Chair in the Law of International Economic Integration.
- Herbert Marx, Canadian lawyer, university law professor, politician, and judge
- James Mallory – for many years Canada's leading constitutional scholar
- Christophe-Alphonse Geoffrion, Canadian lawyer, professor, and Canadian cabinet member
- Charles Joseph Doherty (BCL 1876, Hon. LLD 1913) – Minister of Justice and Attorney General, 1911–1921
- H. Patrick Glenn, comparative legal scholar and author of "Legal Traditions of the World".
- Patrick Healy (BCL 1981), judge at the Quebec Court of Appeal.
- John Peters Humphrey (BCL 1929, LLB 1976), founding director of the United Nations Human Rights division and principal drafter of the Universal Declaration of Human Rights
- Daniel Jutras, former Dean of McGill Law and current Recteur of Université de Montréal
- Marianne Scott, first woman to be appointed as National Librarian of Canada
- David Johnston (LLD 2000), fourteenth principal and vice-chancellor of McGill University, and former governor general of Canada
- Pierre-Marc Johnson, Canadian lawyer, physician, 24th premier of Quebec
- Nicholas Kasirer (BCL 1985, LLB 1985), scholar of civil law, comparative law, and law and language, dean of the faculty 2004–2009, Supreme Court of Canada judge
- Donald James Johnston (BCL 1958, LLD 2003), 4th secretary general of the Organization for Economic Cooperation and Development (OECD) and Attorney General of Canada from 1984 to 1988.
- David Lametti (BCL 1989, LLB 1989), MP for LaSalle—Émard—Verdun, Canadian minister of justice, and former parliamentary secretary to the minister of international trade
- Robert Leckey (BCL/LLB 2002), Superior Court of Quebec judge; formerly dean and holder of the Samuel Gale Chair.
- Richard Lehun (BCL/LLB 2005, DCL 2007) German-Canadian inter-disciplinary visual artist, professor of fiduciary law and justice theory
- W. C. J. Meredith, special federal prosecutor at the trial of Fred Rose, for whom the Meredith Memorial Lectures are named
- Roderick A. Macdonald, Dean of the faculty (1984–1989) influential law reformer, scholar, teacher, mentor and founding president of the Law Commission of Canada
- Stephen A. Smith, scholar of contractual and remedial law.
- Margaret Somerville, ethicist and former Samuel Gale Professor of Law.
- William Tetley, maritime law scholar, Quebec MNA for Notre-Dame-de-Grâce and Cabinet Minister.
- Michael Trebilcock legal scholar in economics
- Stephen Toope (BCL 1983, LLB 1983, LLD 2017), international law scholar, vice-chancellor of Cambridge University and former president of the University of British Columbia.
- Orville Sievwright Tyndale, Canadian judge and chancellor of McGill University
- Robert Stanley Weir (BCL 1880, DCL 1897), Quebec judge, considered one of the leading experts of the day on Quebec's municipal civil law

=== Alumni ===
==== Justices of the Supreme Court of Canada ====
- Douglas Abbott (BCL 1918), puisne justice of the Supreme Court of Canada – appointed to the Court in 1954, previously Minister of National Defence and Minister of Finance
- Louis-Philippe de Grandpré (BCL 1938), puisne justice of the Supreme Court of Canada – appointed to the Court in 1974, formerly president of the Canadian Bar Association
- Marie Deschamps (LLM 1983), puisne justice of the Supreme Court of Canada – appointed to the Court in 2002, previously a judge on the Quebec Court of Appeal
- Morris Fish (BCL 1962), puisne justice of the Supreme Court of Canada – appointed to the Court in 2003, previously a judge on the Quebec Court of Appeal
- Clément Gascon (BCL 1981), puisne justice of the Supreme Court of Canada – appointed to the Court in 2014, previously a judge on the Quebec Court of Appeal
- Désiré Girouard (BCL 1860), puisne justice of the Supreme Court of Canada – appointed to the Court in 1895, previously member of Parliament
- Charles D. Gonthier (BCL 1951), puisne justice of the Supreme Court of Canada – appointed to the Court in 1989, previously a judge on the Quebec Court of Appeal
- Mahmud Jamal (BCL’93, LLB’93), puisne justice of the Supreme Court of Canada – appointed to the Court in 2021, previously a judge on the Court of Appeal for Ontario
- Nicholas Kasirer (BCL 1985, LLB 1985), puisne justice of the Supreme Court of Canada – appointed to the Court in 2019, previously a judge on the Quebec Court of Appeal
- Gerald Le Dain (BCL 1949), puisne justice of the Supreme Court of Canada – appointed to the Court in 1984, previously a judge on the Federal Court of Appeal
- Sheilah L. Martin (BCL 1981, LLB 1981), puisne justice of the Supreme Court of Canada – appointed to the Court in 2017, previously judge of the Court of Appeal of Alberta
- Pierre-Basile Mignault (BCL 1878), puisne justice of the Supreme Court of Canada – appointed to the Court in 1918, previously president of the Bar of Montreal
- Thibaudeau Rinfret (BCL 1900), Chief Justice of the Supreme Court of Canada – appointed to the Court in 1924, previously a judge on the Superior Court of Quebec

==== Jurists and legal professionals ====
- Jean-Louis Baudouin (BCL 1958, LLD 2007)
- Akintola Olufemi Eyiwunmi (LLM 1964), justice for the Supreme Court of Nigeria
- Morag Wise, Lady Wise (LLM 1994) - Senator of the College of Justice, a judge of Scotland's Supreme Court.
- Harry Batshaw (BCL 1924), justice for the Quebec Superior Court
- Robert Black (LLM 1970), professor emeritus of Scots Law at the University of Edinburgh
- Joseph Dainow (BCL 1929), prominent Canadian-American professor of law Louisiana State University
- Alanna Devine (BCL/LLB 2006), former director of Animal Advocacy at the Montreal branch of the Canadian Society for the Prevention of Cruelty to Animals
- John Gomery (BCL 1956), former judge of the Quebec Superior Court.
- Benjamin J. Greenberg (BA’54, BCL’57), judge for the Quebec Superior Court
- R. A. E. Greenshields (BCL 1885), Chief Justice of the Superior Court of Quebec; Dean of the McGill University Faculty of Law, and 9th chancellor of Bishop's University
- Julius Grey (BCL 1971), Quebec human rights lawyer
- Michelle Hanlon (LLM 2017), founder and president of For All Moonkind, president of the National Space Society, co-director of the Center for Air and Space Law at the University of Mississippi School of Law
- Alexandra Harrington (DCL 2015), professor of law at Albany Law School
- Chile Eboe-Osuji (LLM 1991), Nigerian judge of the International Criminal Court, The Hague and former president of the International Criminal Court
- Alison Harvison-Young (BCL 1983, LLB 1983), family law expert and judge of the Court of Appeal for Ontario, former Dean of Queen's University Faculty of Law
- James K. Hugessen (BCL 1957) judge currently serving on the Federal Court of Canada
- William Carlos Ives (BCL 1899), judge for the Supreme Court of Alberta
- Mahmud Jamal (BCL/LLB 1993), former judge on the Court of Appeal for Ontario; now a judge of the Supreme Court of Canada
- Glenn Joyal (BCL 1986), Chief Justice of the Court of Queen's Bench of Manitoba
- Bartha Knoppers (BCL 1978, LLB 1981) Canadian law professor and an expert on the ethical aspects of genetics, genomics and biotechnology
- Richard Lehun (BCL/LLB 2005, DCL 2007) German-Canadian inter-disciplinary visual artist, professor of fiduciary law and justice theory
- Allan Lutfy (BCL 1968) Justice and former chief justice of the Federal Court of Canada
- Marie-Claire Cordonier Segger, Leverhulme Trust Visiting Professor at the University of Cambridge
- Amir Ali Majid (DCL 1985), Pakistani judge, legal scholar and author, first blind person in the world to become a Doctor of Civil Law
- Edward Stuart McDougall, judge on the International Military Tribunal for the Far East
- Mayo Moran (LLB 1990), professor of law, provost and vice-chancellor of Trinity College, Toronto
- Siobhán Phelan (LLM 1994), judge of the High Court of Ireland
- Brian Slattery (BCL 1968), professor emeritus of law at Osgoode Hall Law School, prominent academic in Canadian Constitutional Law and Aboriginal rights discourse
- Margaret Somerville (DCL 1978), Australian ethicist and professor of bioethics at University of Notre Dame Australia
- George Springate, former CFL player for the Grey Cup-winning Montreal Alouettes, politician, and Citizenship Judge
- Max M. Teitelbaum (BCL 1957), puisne justice of the Federal Court of Canada.
- Rıza Türmen (LLM 1980) – former judge of the European Court of Human Rights, former Member of the Turkish Parliament and Turkish ambassador to Switzerland
- Richard Warman (LLM 2004), renowned Canadian human rights lawyer
- Ashfaq Khalfan (BCL/LLB 2002), international jurist in human rights law, director of the Law and Policy Programme at Amnesty International, and chair of the board of governors of the Centre for International Sustainable Development Law

==== Political figures ====
- John Abbott (BCL 1854) – 3rd prime minister of Canada
- Doris Akol (LLM 2001) – Former Commissioner General Uganda Revenue Authority
- Warren Allmand (BCL 1952) – served variously as Solicitor General, Minister of Indian Affairs and Northern Development, and Minister of Consumer and Corporate Affairs between 1972 and 1979.
- Will Amos (BCL/LLB 2004) – Liberal politician, MP for the riding of Pontiac.
- W. David Angus (BCL 1962) – former Canadian senator
- Laetitia Avia (LLM 2013) – French lawyer and politician of La République En Marche! (LREM) who served as the member of the National Assembly for the 8th constituency of Paris from 2017 to 2022
- Rachel Bendayan (BA’02, BCL/LLB’06) – Member of Parliament for Outremont
- Peng Ming-min (LLM 1953) – prominent Taiwanese democracy and independence activist
- Albert Joseph Brown (BCL 1886) – Senator for Wellington, 1932–1938
- Barry Campbell (BCL 1971) – lawyer, lobbyist and former politician
- Leo Kolber (BCL 1952) – Canadian businessman, philanthropist and Senator, serving from 1983 to 2004
- Sir Richard Lionel Cheltenham – President of the Senate of Barbados from 2018 to 2020
- Jérôme Choquette (BCL 1946) – prominent lawyer and Quebec politician
- Michal Cotler-Wunsh (LLM 2006) – Israeli politician, member of the Knesset for the Blue and White alliance
- George Washington Stephens (BCL 1863) – Canadian businessman, lawyer, and politician
- Maurice Alexander (BA 1908; BCL 1910) – Liberal Member of the House of Commons in the British Parliament for Southwark South East, UK
- Rıza Türmen (LLM 1980) – ambassador of Turkey to Switzerland
- Carl Goldenberg (BCL 1932) – Canadian senator
- Brooke Claxton (BCL 1946) – minister of health, 1943–1946; minister of national defence, 1946–1954.
- John Joseph Curran (LLB 1862) – first Solicitor General of Canada.
- Henry Joseph Cloran (BCL 1883) – Senator for Victoria, Quebec, 1903–1928
- Eddie Goldenberg (BCL 1974, LLD 2004) – longtime senior advisor to Canadian Prime Minister Jean Chrétien
- Samuel William Jacobs (BCL 1893) – Canadian lawyer, Member of Parliament and a leader of the Canadian Jewish community
- Thomas D'Arcy McGee (BCL 1861) – Member of Parliament, Minister of agriculture, immigration and statistics, and Father of Canadian Confederation.
- Charles Dewey Day – Chancellor of McGill University (1864–1884), political figure in Canada East
- Charles Drury (BCL 1936) – Minister of Finance, Defence, Public Works, Industry, and President of the Treasury Board
- Ken Dryden (LLB 1973), cabinet minister, MP for York Centre, and Hockey Hall of Fame member, six-time Stanley Cup Winner
- Brian Gallant (LLM 2011), former premier of New Brunswick
- Yoine Goldstein (BCL 1958), former Canadian senator
- Harry Blank (BCL 1950) – Attorney, Liberal politician, and seven-term member of the National Assembly of Quebec
- Stanley Hartt (BCL 1963), lawyer, businessman and chief of staff to Canadian prime minister Brian Mulroney
- Arnold Heeney (BCL 1927) – ambassador to the United States and NATO
- Christopher Benfield Carter (BCL 1866) – Quebec lawyer and politician
- George Carlyle Marler (BCL 1922) – Quebec politician, notary and philatelist
- Véronique Hivon (BCL 1994, LLB 1994), member of the National Assembly of Quebec for Joliette
- Balarama Holness (JD/BCL 2021), rights activist, former Canadian Football League (CFL) player, candidate for mayor in the 2021 Montreal municipal elections
- Anthony Housefather (BCL 1993, LLB 1993), Liberal politician, MP for the riding of Mount Royal
- John Peters Humphrey (BCom’25, BA’27, BCL’29, PhD’45, LLD’76), first director of the UN's Human Rights Division, principal author of the first draft of the Universal Declaration of Human Rights
- George Gordon Hyde (BCL 1908), prominent lawyer and Member of the Legislative Assembly of Quebec for Westmount–Saint-Georges
- Samuel William Jacobs (BCL 1893) – Member of Parliament for George-Étienne Cartier, Quebec
- Kurt Jaeger (LLM 1989) – current ambassador of Liechtenstein to the United States
- Marie-Claire Kirkland-Casgrain (BCL’50, LLD’97) – first woman to become a member of the National Assembly of Quebec, lawyer and judge
- Adrian Knatchbull-Hugessen (BCL 1914) – Canadian lawyer and senator
- Rodolphe Laflamme (BCL 1856, DCL 1873) – 5th attorney general of Canada
- Michael Pitfield (BCL 1958) – former Canadian senator and senior civil servant
- David Lametti (BCL 1989, LLB 1989) – Liberal politician, MP for the riding of LaSalle—Émard—Verdun, Canadian Minister of Justice, and former Parliamentary Secretary to the minister of international trade.
- Sir Wilfrid Laurier (BCL 1866) – 7th prime minister of Canada
- Joël Lightbound (BCL/LLB 2011) – Liberal politician, MP for the riding of Louis-Hébert.
- Hillel Neuer (BCL 1997, LLB 1997) – international lawyer, writer, and executive director of UN Watch.
- Peter Samuel George Mackenzie (BCL 1883) – Liberal Member of the Legislative Assembly of Quebec for Richmond
- Donald Macmaster (BCL 1871) – elected politician in both Canada and the United Kingdom
- Alan Macnaughton (BCL 1927) – former Member of Parliament and Speaker of the House of Commons.
- Joni Madraiwiwi (LLM 1989) – former acting president and vice-president of the Republic of Fiji and Chief Justice of the Supreme Court of the Republic of Nauru
- Marcel Massé (BCL 1961) – Canadian politician, civil servant and Rhodes Scholar
- Catherine McKenna (LLB 1999) – Liberal politician, MP for the riding of Ottawa Centre, and Minister of Infrastructure and Communities.
- Marc Miller (BCL/LLB 2001) – Lawyer and MP for the Liberal current Canadian minister of indigenous services
- Walter George Mitchell (BCL 1901) – Member of the Legislative Assembly of Quebec for Richmond
- Elizabeth Monk (BCL 1923) – Canadian lawyer and Montreal city councillor, one of the first two women admitted to the Quebec Bar
- Alexander Morris (BCL 1850, MA 1852, and a DCL 1862) – second lieutenant governor of Manitoba (1872–1877)
- Frederick Debartzch Monk (BCL 1877) – minister of public works, 1911–1912
- Thomas Mulcair (BCL 1976, LLB 1977) – former leader of the NDP of the Official Opposition, MP for Outremont, former Quebec MNA for Chomedy and minister of environment.
- Joe Oliver (BCL 1964) – former MP for Eglinton—Lawrence, Minister of Finance and Minister of Natural Resources.
- Narcisse Pérodeau (BCL 1876) – Quebec politician and the 14th lieutenant governor of Quebec
- Jim Peterson (DCL 1970) – Minister of international trade, 2003–2006
- Sydney David Pierce (BCL 1925, LLD 1956) – Olympic hurdler and ambassador to Brazil, Belgium, Luxembourg, Mexico, and the OECD
- Lazarus Phillips (BCL 1918) – lawyer and senator
- John Rankin (LLM 1984) – Governor-General of Bermuda
- Greg Rickford (BCL/LLB 2005) – Minister of Natural Resources, 2014–2015
- Alexander Cameron Rutherford (BCL 1881) – first premier of Alberta, founder of the University of Alberta
- Larry W. Smith (BCL 1976) – Canadian senator, nine season running back for Montreal Alouettes and 8th commissioner of the CFL
- Francis R. Scott (BCL 1927, LLD 1967) – constitutional rights lawyer, civil libertarian, poet, founder of the first social democratic party and the NDP
- Kathleen Weil (BCL 1982, LLB 1982) – member of the National Assembly of Quebec for Notre-Dame-de-Grâce
- William Alexander Weir (BCL 1881) – Quebec judge and politician
- Nick Whalen (LLB 2011) – lawyer and former MP for the Liberal Party
- Kirsten Hillman (BCL 1993, LLB 1993) – Canadian ambassador to the United States

==== Other alumni ====
- Isidore Gordon Ascher (BCL 1862), Scottish-Canadian novelist and poet
- David Berger (BCL 1975), former president of the Canadian Football League and member of parliament
- Strachan Bethune, twice Bâtonnier of Montreal and the 1st Anglican chancellor of the Diocese of Montreal
- David P. O'Brien (BCL 1965), businessman, currently as chairman of Royal Bank of Canada
- Peter Blaikie (BCL 1965), Quebec lawyer, politician, co-founder of Heenan Blaikie
- Mark Boidman, prominent media and tech investment banker and attorney, specializing in mergers and acquisitions
- Walker Boone, actor, best known as the voice of the Nintendo character Mario
- Michael Byers (BCL, LLB 1992), Canadian legal scholar and non-fiction author
- Lionel Chetwynd (BCL 1967), British-American screenwriter, director and producer
- Eleanor Clitheroe (LLM 1978), former president and CEO of Hydro One
- Leonard Cohen, singer-songwriter (who only did a year of law before dropping out)
- Chuck Comeau, drummer for Simple Plan (studied law but ultimately dropped out)
- James Creighton (BCL 1880) "father of organized hockey"
- Caroline Crossley (BCL/JD Candidate) Olympic Rugby Silver medalist
- Mary Dawson (BCL 1963), civil servant, former Conflict of Interest and Ethics Commissioner of Canada.
- James de Beaujeu Domville (BCL 1957) theatrical producer and administrator, former commissioner of National Film Board of Canada (NFB)
- Dennis Draper (dropped out before completing his studies), Brigadier-General, Chief Constable of the Toronto Police Department from 1928 to 1946
- Yves Fortier (BCL 1958, LLD 2005), Canadian ambassador to the United Nations and President of the United Nations Security Council.
- George Buchanan Foster (BCL 1921), First World War flying ace and prominent attorney.
- Michael Goldbloom (BCL 1978, LLB 1979), principal and vice-chancellor of Bishop's University in Lennoxville, Quebec; former publisher of the Toronto Star
- Shaul Gordon (BCL/JD 2019, LLM 2021), Canadian-Israeli award-winning fencer, Olympic athlete (Tokyo 2020, Paris 2024)
- Charles Goren (BCL 1922), American bridge player and best-selling writer
- Anne-France Goldwater (BCL 1980), attorney and television judge personality on "L'Arbitre"
- A. Jean de Grandpré (BCL 1943), first chairman and CEO of BCE Inc.
- Roy Heenan (BCL 1960, LLD 2008), Labour lawyer, academic, and co-founder of Heenan Blaikie
- Nandasiri Jasentuliyana (LLM 1965), director of the United Nations Office for Outer Space Affairs, Deputy Director-General, United Nations Office at Vienna, president of International Institute of Space Law
- Alex Johnston (BCL/LLB 1999), lawyer, author, and businesswoman, co-chair of the McGill Institute for the Study of Canada
- Edward Johnson (BCL/LLB 1978), chair of the Pierre Elliott Trudeau Foundation
- Tasha Kheiriddin (BCL/LLB 1993), conservative television media personality, public policy analyst and commentator
- Hubert Lacroix (BCL 1976), former CEO and president of the Canadian Broadcasting Corporation
- David Lawee (BCL 1993), tech executive, founder of Google Capital
- Sidney Leithman (BCL 1960), Canadian defense lawyer
- John Harrison (LLB 1989, LLM 1992), British lawyer and general counsel of Airbus since 2015
- Anthony Lemke (BCL/LLB) television and film actor, lawyer and entrepreneur
- Annie MacDonald Langstaff (BCL 1914), the first woman to earn a law degree in Quebec, a legal activist, supporter of women's suffrage and an early woman aviator
- Stephen Leopold (BCL 1975), Canadian real estate developer
- William Douw Lighthall(BCL 1881), lawyer, historian, novelist, poet and philosopher
- James Lockyer (LLB 1973), founding director of the Innocence Canada
- David Ross McCord (BCL 1867) lawyer, philanthropist, founder of the McCord Museum
- Hilmi M. Zawati (LLB 1978, MA 1986, PhD 1994, LLM 1997, DCL 2010), International Criminal Law Jurist, and Chair of Centre for International Accountability and Justice (CIAJ)
- Don Meehan (LLB 1975), founder of Newport Sports agency, which represents several hockey players in the NHL.
- Mayo Moran (LLB 1990), Dean of University of Toronto Faculty of Law 2006–2014, first female dean.
- Pierre Péladeau (BCL 1950), founder of Canadian media company Quebecor Inc.
- Richard Pound (BCL 1962, LLD 2009), Canadian swimming champion, lawyer and prominent spokesman for ethics in sport.
- Jennifer Stoddart (BCL 1980, LLD 2015), civil servant, sixth Privacy Commissioner of Canada
- Frank Shoofey (BA 1961, BCL 1964), criminal lawyer
- Timothy Porteous (BA'54, BCL'57), former head of the Canada Council and the Ontario College of Art and Design
- Paulos Tesfagiorgis (LLM), Eritrean human rights activist
- Stephen Toope (BCL 1983, LLB 1983, LLD 2017), international legal scholar, vice-chancellor of Cambridge University and former president of the University of British Columbia
- Robert Stanley Weir (BCL 1880, DCL 1897), Quebec judge and poet most famous for writing the English lyrics to "O Canada", the national anthem of Canada
- Mortimer Zuckerman (BCL 1961), Canadian-American billionaire media magnate, co-founder, executive chairman and former CEO of Boston Properties

=== Deans of the Faculty ===
The study of law at McGill began in 1844 when William Badgley was appointed lecturer in law within the Faculty of Arts. While informal classes began earlier, the Faculty of Law was officially established at McGill in 1853, with William Badgley appointed its first dean. Over the years, the following people have served the Faculty of Law as deans.

- 1853–1855: William Badgley, DCL 1870
- 1855–1876: John Abbott, BCL 1854, DCL 1867
- 1876–1888: William Hastings Kerr (acting dean, 1876–1881), BCL 1872
- 1888–1896: Norman W. Trenholme, BCL 1865, DCL 1887
- 1896–1897: Leonidas Davidson, BCL 1864
- 1897–1914: Frederick Parker Walton, LLD 1915
- 1914–1915: Sir Charles Peers Davidson (acting dean), BCL 1863, DCL 1875, LLD 1912
- 1915–1921: Robert Warden Lee, DCL 1877
- 1921–1928: R. A. E. Greenshields (acting dean, 1921–1923), BCL 1885, LLD 1929
- 1928–1936: Percy Ellwood Corbett, DCL 1961
- 1936–1946: C. Stuart Lemesurier, BCL 1912
- 1946: John P. Humphrey (dean designate), BCL 1929, PhD 1945, LLD 1976
- 1946–1949: C. Stuart Lemesurier, BCL 1912
- 1949: Gérald Fauteux, LLD 1955
- 1950: A. Sydney Bruneau, BCL 1917
- 1950–1960: W. C. J. Meredith
- 1960–1961: Maxwell Cohen (acting dean), LLD 1994
- 1961–1964: F. R. Scott, BCL 1927, LLD 1967
- 1964–1969: Maxwell Cohen, LLD 1994
- 1969–1974: John W. Durnford, BCL 1952
- 1974–1979: John E. C. Brierley, BCL 1959
- 1979–1980: William Foster (acting dean)
- 1980–1984: John E. C. Brierley, BCL 1959
- 1984–1989: Roderick A. Macdonald
- 1989–1994: Yves-Marie Morissette
- 1994–1999: Stephen Toope, BCL 1983, LLB 1983, LLD 2017
- 1999–2003: Peter Leuprecht
- 2003–2009: Nicholas Kasirer, BCL 1985, LLB 1985
- 2009: Shauna Van Praagh (acting dean)
- 2009–2016: Daniel Jutras (acting dean, 2009–2010)
- 2016–2025: Robert Leckey, BCL/LLB 2002
- 2025-present: Tina Piper (interim dean)

== Student life ==
=== Law Student Association ===
The overarching student organization is the Law Student's Association (LSA): an elected group of law students who represent the student body. The LSA was created in 1912 and incorporated in 1992. The executives and representatives of the LSA are elected by McGill's law students.

During the school year, the LSA hosts a weekly coffeehouse on Thursday evenings designed to encourage students to network and socialize over food and drink. The coffeehouse tradition was started in 1989 by David Lametti when he was part of the LSA. Some coffeehouse events are sponsored by law firms for networking with students, while others are hosted by student associations and clubs.

=== Christie Bike Ride ===
The Dugald Christie Memorial Community Bike Ride, also called the Christie Bike Ride, is an annual charity fundraiser organized by McGill Law students. Funds are distributed to local organizations that increase access to justice, especially for marginalized communities. Past recipients of the funds include Project Genesis, Head and Hands, and the Native Women's Shelter of Montreal.

The Christie Bike Ride was started in 2009 in honour of alumnus Dugald Christie. Christie was a Vancouver-based lawyer that championed access to justice for low-income communities. He was killed while cycling from Vancouver to Ottawa to raise awareness about access to justice.

=== Journals ===
==== McGill Law Journal ====
The McGill Law Journal (MLJ) was founded by Gerald Le Dain and Jacques-Yvan Morin in 1952. The MLJ publishes four volumes a year on general law topics. The MLJ is frequently cited by the Supreme Court of Canada and is the most cited student-run law journal by the Court.

The McGill Law Journal also publishes the Canadian Guide to Uniform Legal Citation. The original Guide was published in 1986 and was intended to standardize Canadian legal citations. Today, the Guide is used by most Canadian legal journals. McGill Law Journal regularly hosts office hours to assist McGill students using the Canadian Guide to Uniform Legal Citation.

==== McGill Journal of Sustainable Development Law ====
The McGill Journal of Sustainable Development Law (MJSDL) was established in 2004 and focuses on sustainable development and environmental law and policy. It is peer-reviewed and published bi-annually.

==== McGill Journal of Law and Health ====
The McGill Journal of Law and Health (MJLH) was established in 2007. It is a peer-reviewed, open-access journal and is published annually. The MJLH focuses on health law and has been cited four times by the Supreme Court of Canada. Most recently, an article from the journal was cited in the Reference Re Assisted Human Reproduction Act.

==== McGill Journal of Dispute Resolution ====
The McGill Journal of Dispute Resolution (MJDR) is a bilingual peer-reviewed academic journal dedicated to scholarship in the fields of arbitration, mediation, facilitation, negotiation and other forms of alternative dispute resolution. MJDR was first published in 2015.

=== Legal Information Clinic at McGill ===
The Legal Information Clinic at McGill is a non-profit legal information clinic for McGill students and the Montreal community. The Legal Information Clinic is a separate entity from McGill but is run by McGill law students. Originally founded in 1973 by then-law student Michael Bergman, the Clinic works on more than 2,000 cases a year.

The Clinic also provides a student advocacy service for McGill students accused of disciplinary offences or looking to resolve disputes with McGill University.

=== Quid Novi ===
Quid Novi, also known colloquially as the Quid, is the Faculty of Law's student-run newspaper. Since the publication of its first edition in March 1981, Quid Novi has been a forum for both students and faculty to share news and opinions on both legal and non-legal matters. Quid Novi is published on a weekly basis during the academic year.

=== L.E.X. Outreach Program ===
The Faculty of Law of McGill University founded the Law-Éducation-Connexion Outreach Program (also known as the L.E.X. Outreach Program) in 2006. The program has law student volunteers deliver presentations at local schools and answer student questions. The program targets youth in communities that are traditionally underrepresented in the legal field and schools that have high dropout rates, with the goal of encouraging an interest in post-secondary education and legal studies. In 2009, the program was expanded following a donation from the Beaverbrook Canadian Foundation.

== See also ==
- List of law schools in Canada
- McGill Law Journal
- McGill Journal of Sustainable Development Law
- Canadian Guide to Uniform Legal Citation
