= Stephen Scott =

Stephen Scott may refer to:

- Stephen Scott (composer) (1944–2021), American composer
- Stephen Scott (cricketer) (born 1967), Zimbabwean cricketer
- Stephen Scott (writer) (1948–2011), American Anabaptist writer
- Stephen Scott (jazz pianist) (born 1969), American jazz pianist
- Stephen Scott (rugby union) (1955–1994), New Zealand rugby union player
- Stephen H. Scott (born 1964), Canadian neuroscientist
- Stephen Allan Scott (born 1940), Canadian law professor
- Steven Scott (born 1985), English sport shooter

== See also ==
- Steve Scott (disambiguation)
