= Steve Scott =

Steve Scott may refer to:

- Steve Scott (comics) (born 1968), American comic artist
- Steve Scott (computer architect)
- Steve Scott (cricketer) (born 1955), New Zealand cricketer
- Steve Scott (footballer) (born 1966), Welsh footballer
- Steve Scott (journalist) (born 1961), British journalist
- Steve Scott (performer), American country/Americana musician, songwriter, singer, guitarist, producer and actor
- Steve Scott (poet) (born 1951), British poet and musician
- Steve Scott (producer), co-founder of adult movie production company Third World Media
- Steve Scott (rugby union) (born 1974), player and coach
- Steve Scott (runner) (born 1956), American male athlete and founder of speed golf
- Steve Scott (wrestler) (born 1984), Canadian professional wrestler
- Steve Scott, builder of the show car Uncertain T
- Stevie Scott, American football running back

== See also ==
- Stephen Scott (disambiguation)
