= Dugald Christie =

Dugald Christie may refer to:

- Dugald Christie (missionary) (1855–1936), British missionary to China
- Dugald Christie (lawyer) (1941–2006), Canadian lawyer and political activist
