= The Jailhouse Rock Cafe =

Club and concert venue in Montreal, Quebec

The Jailhouse Rock Café
- the Jailhouse
- Interactive map of The Jailhouse Rock Café
- Location: 30, Mont-Royal West; Montreal, Quebec; H2X 1K5
- Coordinates: 45.51974°N 73.58667°W
- Type: Club and concert venue
- Events: Punk rock, alternative rock, metalcore, hardcore punk, ska, underground,

Construction
- Opened: 1992
- Closed: 2001

Website
- www.bookofshows.com

The Jailhouse Rock Cafe was a club and concert venue located at 30 Mont-Royal West in Montreal, Quebec, Canada in a neighbourhood known as Le Plateau-Mont-Royal. The venue, founded by Jacques Corbo, opened in 1992 and established itself as an important centre for underground music, Underground art and culture in Montreal.

== History ==
The site of the Jailhouse Rock Café initially housed, from 1920 to 1957, the Belmont Moving Picture Theatre. The building was then home to a Greek restaurant (1960–1983) and later, Bar La Terrasse (1987–1992) before the Jailhouse's opening.

The venue was founded by Jacques Corbo. In late 1993, Corbo eventually sold the Jailhouse to employee Greg Kitzler along with Ted N. and Damian H. In 1994, Kitzler hired Domenic Castelli as the main booker for the venue. However, in 1998, the young owners resigned themselves to reselling the bar to Jacques Corbo due to the uncertainty created by the province of Quebec biker war, although the bar had no affiliation with bikers. After a lull of the biker war, Corbo sold to brothers Domenic and David Castelli who then ran the venue.

During the 1980s and 1990s, Bar La Terrasse/the Jailhouse was an important site for a wide variety of acts that were part of punk, ska, industrial, metal, hip-hop and gothic musical scenes in Montreal, and the venue soon became a recurrent stop for international touring artists, with Domenic Castelli frequently acting as host as well as promoter for many of the concerts held at the venue. Castelli's first concert was a late 1980s benefit for Montreal youth organisation Head & Hands featuring punk band the Ripcordz. But Domenic Castelli's first job was cleaning up after punk bands at Bar La Terrasse, before he began to book concerts there, and later at the Jailhouse.

Many critically acclaimed artists performed at the venue including local and international acts: Grimskunk, Jon Spencer Blues Explosion, Neko Case, Calexico, Nada Surf, the Planet Smashers and Tricky Woo. In addition to live concerts, the Jailhouse hosted a wide range of other events, including art jams and exhibitions, community BBQs and screenings.

After the Jailhouse ceased to operate, the Castelli brothers opened another live venue, the Jupiter Room, located on Saint-Laurent boulevard, which was in operation until 2005. After the Jupiter Room, Domenic Castelli continued to work as a stage manager for touring concerts, circusses and other live events.

In 2020, Domenic Castelli compiled a book of posters of shows held at the Jailhouse from 1988 to 2001. The book was well received and according to Cult Montreal, "there are plenty of gems in these pages to keep the avid rock fan, Montrealer or otherwise, wide-eyed with history and nostalgia."
