= Sexual assault law of Canada =

Sexual assault law of Canada is set out in the Criminal Code enacted by the Parliament of Canada. It consists of three separate offences: sexual assault; sexual assault with a weapon, threats, or causing bodily harm; and aggravated sexual assault. The offences are gender-neutral: males and females can commit the offences, and males and females can be victims of the offences.

The offences are contained in Part VIII of the Criminal Code, dealing with offences against the person and reputation, which contains other types of assaults. The general principles which apply to common assault also apply to sexual assaults, although there are some particular provisions relating to the definition of consent in sexual assault cases, and the evidence that can be called by the defence at trial.

The offence of sexual assault is a hybrid offence, in that it can be dealt with as either an indictable offence or a summary conviction offence, at the discretion of the Crown prosecutor. The potential sentence varies depending on whether the Crown proceeds by indictment or summarily. The other two offences are indictable only.

The sexual assault offences were enacted by Parliament in 1982 and came into force on January 4, 1983. The offence of rape was abolished at the same time and no longer exists in Canadian law.

== Definition of the offences ==
=== Sexual assault ===
The offence of sexual assault is defined by two separate provisions of the Criminal Code: the basic definition of assault, found in s. 265, and the sentences for sexual assault, set out in s. 271. In general terms, s. 265(1) defines assault as the intentional application of force to an individual, without their consent, while s. 265(2) provides that this definition of assault applies to all forms of assault, including the sexual assault offences.

Section 271 then provides that anyone who commits a sexual assault is liable to imprisonment for up to ten years if convicted on indictment (or up to fourteen years if the complainant is under sixteen years old), or up to eighteen months if convicted summarily (or up to two years less a day if the complainant is under sixteen).

=== Sexual assault with a weapon, threats, or bodily harm ===
The offence of sexual assault with a weapon, threats, or bodily harm is defined by the general definition of assault, combined with s. 272(1), which provides:

272 (1) Every person commits an offence who, in committing a sexual assault,

(a) carries, uses or threatens to use a weapon or an imitation of a weapon;

(b) threatens to cause bodily harm to a person other than the complainant;

(c) causes bodily harm to the complainant;

(c.1) chokes, suffocates or strangles the complainant; or

(d) is a party to the offence with any other person.

=== Aggravated sexual assault ===
The third offence, aggravated sexual assault, is defined by the general definition of assault and s. 273(1):

273 (1) Every one commits an aggravated sexual assault who, in committing a sexual assault, wounds, maims, disfigures or endangers the life of the complainant.

=== Supreme Court analysis ===
One of the first cases to consider the sexual assault offences was R v Chase, decided by the Supreme Court of Canada in 1987. In a unanimous decision rendered by Justice McIntyre, the Court held that sexual assault is an assault "committed in circumstances of a sexual nature, such that the sexual integrity of the victim is violated." McIntyre stated that this is an objective standard, and will depend on the facts advanced in relation to the case. A number of factors should be considered in determining if a sexual assault is committed, such as the part of the body being touched, the circumstances surrounding the assault, and whether the accused was seeking sexual gratification. Sexual assaults are general intent offences.

== Rationale for the offences ==
Prior to 1983, there were two general offences relating to sexual violence in the Criminal Code: rape and indecent assault. During the 1970s and early 1980s, the definition of rape and the related evidential provisions came under increasing criticism, which ultimately led to the introduction of the new sexual assault offences and the repeal of the offences of rape and indecent assault.

There were four aspects of the offence of rape which drew particular criticism:

- the offence required sexual intercourse to have occurred, i.e. penile penetration; other types of sexual violence were not rape, although they potentially could qualify as indecent assault, which carried lesser penalties;
- rape could only be committed by a man against a woman; sexual violence by a man against a man, by a woman against a woman, or a woman against a man, was not rape;
- the definition of consent was subject to a number of evidential requirements that did not apply to other offences;
- it was not an offence for a man to forcibly have sexual intercourse with his wife; her consent was irrelevant.

There were also evidential requirements, unique to the offence of rape and the definition of consent:

- the accused's mistaken belief in consent did not have to be reasonable;
- the doctrine of recent complaint required the complainant to report the rape as quickly as possible, which imposed an obligation on complainants that did not exist with other offences;
- corroboration of the complainant's testimony was required, which was not a requirement for other offences;
- the previous sexual history of the complainant, and her general reputation for chastity, could be raised by the defence at trial, to undermine the complainant's credibility as a witness.

These critiques of the offence of rape and extensive public pressure by women's advocacy groups and rape crisis centres triggered an evaluation of the law. The Law Reform Commission of Canada recommended that the offence of rape be abolished and replaced with new offences of sexual assault. In 1982, the federal government introduced legislation to create the new offences and to abolish the offence of rape.

The new offences implemented the concept that sexual assault is violence of a sexual nature, rather than aberrant sexual behaviour. A husband no longer could assault his wife. The new offences were gender-neutral and the evidential requirements unique to rape cases were eliminated. The amendments came into force in January 1983.
