= Roderick A. Macdonald =

Canadian legal scholar (1948–2014)

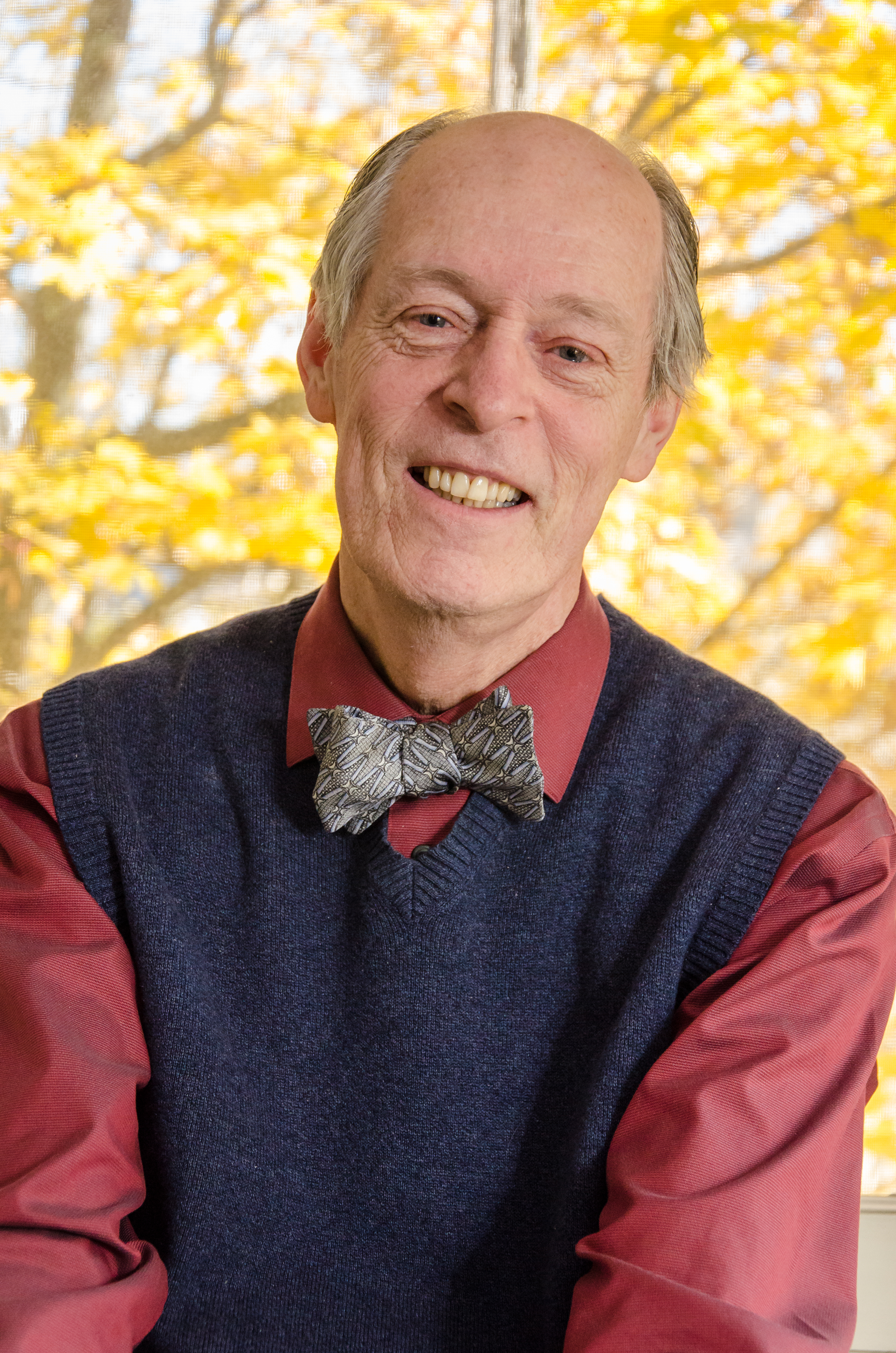
McGill Law Professor Roderick Macdonald seated in his office, in front of a window, 8 November 2011.

Roderick Alexander Macdonald OC FRSC (1948–2014) was a Canadian legal scholar. He was the 111th president of the Royal Society of Canada between 2009 and 2011.

== Biography ==
Macdonald was born in Ontario on 6 August 1948. He was educated at York University (BA), Osgoode Hall Law School (LLB), the University of Ottawa (LLL), and the University of Toronto (LLM). He taught at the University of Windsor Faculty of Law between 1975 and 1979 and at the McGill University Faculty of Law from 1979 to his death on 13 June 2014, serving as its dean between 1984 and 1989. Prolific in his research, Macdonald's academic work often embodied unusual formats. His commitment to the bijural and bilingual environment at McGill University's Faculty of Law helped pave the way for the "transsystemic" legal education later adopted by the institution. Between 1997 and 2000, he served as the first president of the Law Commission of Canada. As a legal theorist, Macdonald had a strong interest in legal pluralism. He advocated a version of legal pluralism he described as "critical", "radical", or "kaleidoscopic". The volume The Unbounded Level of the Mind gathers together essays in honour of Macdonald.

Professional and academic associations
Preceded by Yvan Guindon	President of the Royal Society of Canada; 2009–2011	Succeeded by Yolande Grisé
