= Alison Young =

Alison Young may refer to:

- Alison Harvison Young, judge of the Superior Court of Justice of Ontario
- Alison Young (journalist), American journalist
- Alison Young (legal scholar), British legal scholar
- Alison Young (sailor) (born 1987), British sailor

== See also ==
- Allison Young, a fictional character on the FOX television series Terminator: The Sarah Connor Chronicles
