= Christopher P. Manfredi =

Political science professor and principal

Christopher P. Manfredi (born 24 March 1959) is a professor of political science. He was a former acting Principal (2022–2023) and Provost and Vice-Principal Academic (2015–2026) at McGill University. From 2006 to 2015 he served as McGill's Dean of Arts. He studied at the University of Calgary and received his PhD from Claremont Graduate School. His research focuses on the Supreme Court of Canada.

== Controversies ==
In 2024, Manfredi made the decision to cancel a semester of the McGill Faculty of Law in order to prevent the school's faculty from unionizing. In response, the school's students' union stated that "It has now become clear that McGill recklessly jeopardizes our semesters and the quality of our education in pursuit of its own interests." During the strike, he inadvertently copied a law student and journalist on an internal email to President Deep Saini and Dean Robert Leckey, writing, "Are our students incapable of reading?" and that “I’m a bit worried about the people we’re sending into the legal profession.” The message, which appeared to question student ability amid widespread support for the strike, drew criticism from faculty and students. Manfredi apologized, though neither Saini nor Leckey publicly distanced themselves from the remarks.

In April 2024, after Manfredi liked a tweet on Twitter defending Dave Chappelle for making jokes at the expense of trans people, the student group Queer McGill launched a "Remove Manfredi" campaign.
