= Alison Harvison Young =

Canadian judge

Alison Harvison Young is a Canadian lawyer, legal scholar and former judge who served on the Court of Appeal for Ontario from 2018 to 2025 and the Ontario Superior Court of Justice from 2004 to 2018. She was dean of Queen's University Faculty of Law from 1998 to 2004 and previously taught at McGill University. In June 2026, she joined McCarthy Hansen & Company LLP in Toronto as counsel.

== Early life and education ==
Alison Harvison Young earned a Bachelor of Laws (LL.B. and B.C.L.) degree from McGill University in 1983 and a B.C.L. from Oxford University in 1988.

== Career ==
After graduating from McGill University, Harvison Young clerked for Supreme Court of Canada Justice Willard Estey from 1983 to 1984. She worked on the Administrative Law Project at the Law Reform Commission of Canada and practised litigation at a Toronto law firm from 1985 to 1987.

In 1988, she joined McGill University's Faculty of Law, where she taught public and private law, family law, administrative law, and remedies. She served as associate dean (academic) from 1993 to 1995 and as a visiting professor at the University of Pennsylvania Law School in 1995–1996.

In 1998, Harvison Young was appointed dean and professor at Queen's University Faculty of Law, a position she held until 2004. She also served as chair of the Ontario Council of Law Deans from 2002 to 2004.

=== Judicial career ===
Harvison Young was appointed to the Ontario Superior Court of Justice in 2004. During her tenure, she heard cases involving civil, criminal, commercial, administrative and family law. She also served as administrative judge of the Toronto Small Claims Court from 2009 to 2016 and participated in judicial education and professional development programs..

In August 2018, she was appointed to the Court of Appeal for Ontario where she heard cases in all areas of civil, family and criminal law.. She co-chaired the court's Education Committee and took part in initiatives concerning judicial education, legal ethics and access to justice. She retired from the bench in 2025.

=== Post-judicial career ===
In June 2026, Harvison Young joined McCarthy Hansen & Company LLP, a Toronto family law firm, as counsel. Her work includes providing legal advice, offering mediation services and mentoring lawyers.

=== Research and scholarly work ===
Harvison Young's scholarship has focused on family law, administrative law, human rights, legal remedies and the regulation of new reproductive technologies. Her work on family law has examined how legal rules address changing family structures, including same-sex and blended families, and the relationship between family relationships and legal rights. Her 1998 article, Reconceiving the Family: Challenging the Paradigm of the Exclusive Family, examined the limitations of traditional legal definitions of the family. In The Changing Family, Rights Discourse and the Supreme Court of Canada (2001), she considered developments in family law and rights-based arguments before the Supreme Court of Canada. Her article on Chartier v. Chartier examined step-parent support obligations.

Harvison Young's scholarship in administrative law examined judicial review, human rights tribunals and the relationship between administrative decision-makers and the courts. In a 1991 article co-authored with R. A. Macdonald, she examined developments in Canadian administrative law. Her other publications addressed human rights tribunals, judicial deference and administrative search and seizure under the Canadian Charter of Rights and Freedoms. Her research also covered new reproductive technologies and their legal regulation, particularly their implications for legal definitions of parenthood and family relationships. Her other areas of scholarship included judicial independence, legal ethics and citizenship.

== Professional service ==
Harvison Young has been involved in legal education and professional development throughout her academic and judicial careers. At McGill University, she helped establish academic assistance programs for students beginning their legal studies. She later participated in judicial education programs for newly appointed judges and professional development initiatives for lawyers.

She served on the board of governors of the National Judicial Institute from 2001 to 2004 and contributed to its programs for newly appointed judges. From 2006 to 2017, she taught in the Advocates' Society's Osgoode Hall Written Advocacy Programme. She also participated in initiatives promoting access to justice and legal education.

Her professional service included committee work with the Law Society of Upper Canada, the Canadian Superior Court Judges Association and the Advocates' Society, as well as involvement in the International Society of Women Jurists.

During a study leave at the University of Toronto Faculty of Law in 2017–2018, she prepared a report titled Coming to a Courtroom Near You? Accessing Justice, the Changing Legal Profession, and Emerging Technology: The Road Ahead.

== Awards and honours ==
- John W. Durnford Teaching Excellence Award (1997), awarded by the McGill Faculty of Law Students' Association.
- David Watson Memorial Trust Award, for the article “Canadian Administrative Law on the Threshold of the 1990s,” co-authored with R. A. Macdonald.
- Wainwright Scholarship (1982)
- James McGill Award (1982)
- Fern Gertrude Kennedy Award in Jurisprudence, shared in 1982.

== Selected publications ==
- Young, Alison Harvison (1993). "Keeping the Courts at Bay: The Canadian Human Rights Commission and Its Counterparts in Britain and Northern Ireland: Some Comparative Lessons". The University of Toronto Law Journal. 43 (1): 65. doi:10.2307/825901. ISSN 0042-0220.
- Young, Alison Harvison (1994-10-01). "Joint Custody as Norm: Solomon Revisited". Osgoode Hall Law Journal. 32 (4): 785–816. doi:10.60082/2817-5069.1663. ISSN 2817-5069.
- Young, Alison (1998-01-01). "Reconceiving the Family: Challenging the Paradigm of the Exclusive Family". American University Journal of Gender, Social Policy & the Law. 6 (3).
- Young, A. H.; Wasunna, A. (1998). "Wrestling with the limits of law: regulating new reproductive technologies". Health Law Journal. 6 Spec No: 239–277. ISSN 1192-8336. PMID 14746068.
- "This Child Does Have 2 (Or More) Fathers ...: Step-parents and Support Obligations". McGill Law Journal.
