= James K. Hugessen =

Canadian lawyer, professor and judge (1933–2024)

The Honourable James K. Hugessen CM

Deputy Judge of the Federal Court of Canada
- Incumbent
- Assumed office July 28, 2008

Personal details
- Born: July 26, 1933 Montreal, Quebec, Canada
- Died: April 21, 2024 (aged 90) Almonte, Ontario, Canada
- Education: McGill University; Balliol College, Oxford

James Cornelius Knatchbull-Hugessen CM (July 26, 1933 – April 21, 2024), known professionally as James K. Hugessen, was a Canadian lawyer, professor and judge, first on the Superior Court of Quebec and then on the Federal Court of Canada. He was the son of the senator Adrian Knatchbull-Hugessen.

Born in Montreal in 1933, Hugessen was educated at the University of Oxford and McGill University. After graduating with a BCL from McGill in 1957, he was called to the bar in 1958 and entered private practice.

From 1962 to 1974, Hugessen was an adjunct professor in McGill's Faculty of Law. In 1972, he was appointed a justice of the Quebec Superior Court. In 1983 he became a judge of the Federal Court of Canada, Appeal Division and retired in 2008. After his retirement, he was appointed a deputy judge of the Federal Court.

Hugessen's other appointments included the Administrative Tribunal of the International Labour Organization and the Supreme Court of the North-West Territories. A visually-disabled person, he served as the chair of the federal Task Force on Access to Information for Print-Disabled Canadians.

In 2009, as a result of his outstanding judicial career and long term service to McGill Faculty of Law, Hugessen was given the F.R. Scott Award for Distinguished Service.

In 2014, Hugessen was named a Member of the Order of Canada.

Hugessen's archive is held at the McGill University Archives.

Hugessen died on April 21, 2024, in Almonte, Ontario, at the age of 90.
