= Colleen Sheppard =

Canadian legal scholar

Colleen Sheppard FRSC is a professor of law at McGill University Faculty of Law. She was elected a Fellow of the Royal Society of Canada in 2016. Sheppard's scholarship focuses on human rights issues and constitutional law.

== Works ==
- Sheppard, Colleen (2010). Inclusive Equality: The Relational Dimensions of Systemic Discrimination in Canada. Montreal: McGill–Queen's University Press. ISBN 978-0-7735-8088-6. OCLC 767670438.
