= Charles Gonthier =

Canadian Supreme Court judge

Charles Doherty Gonthier
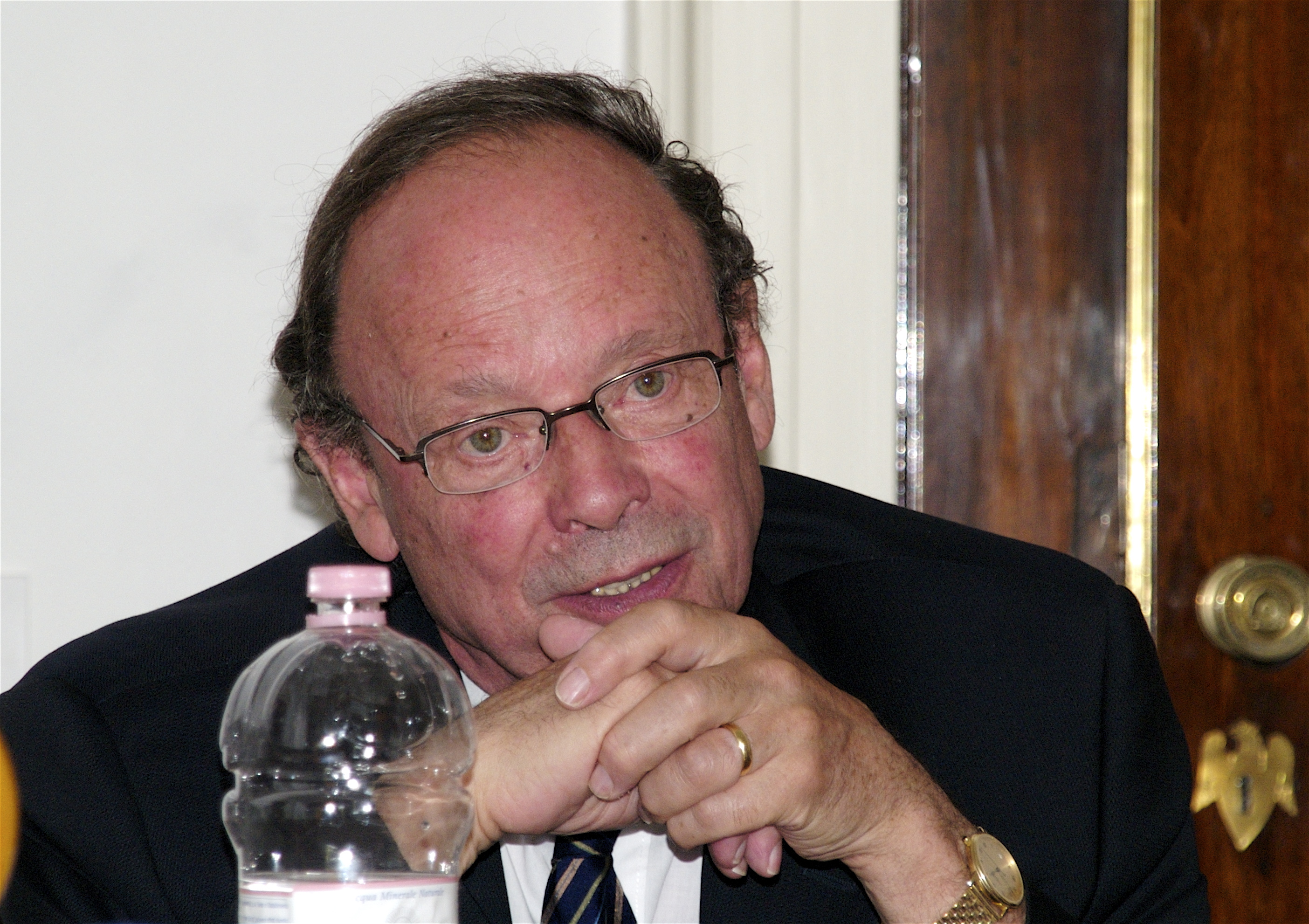

Puisne Justice of the Supreme Court of Canada
- In office February 1, 1989 – August 1, 2003
- Nominated by: Brian Mulroney
- Preceded by: Jean Beetz
- Succeeded by: Morris Fish

Personal details
- Born: August 1, 1928 Montreal, Quebec
- Died: July 17, 2009 (aged 80)
- Resting place: Notre Dame des Neiges Cemetery

Charles Doherty Gonthier, CC (August 1, 1928 – July 16, 2009) was a Puisne judge on the Supreme Court of Canada from February 1, 1989, to August 1, 2003. He was replaced by Morris Fish.

== Early life ==
Gonthier was born in Montreal, Quebec to Georges Gonthier, an accountant who was also Auditor General of Canada from 1924 to 1939, and Kathleen Doherty. Charles was the only child the two had together, although Georges Gonthier, who had been widowed, had other children from his first marriage. Kathleen's father, Charles Doherty, was a lawyer and politician who became federal Minister of Justice. Although Charles Doherty died when Gonthier was only 3, the stories his mother recounted about his grandfather were influential upon his later interest in a law career.

== Education ==
He was educated at École Garneau, Ottawa then at Collège Stanislas in Montreal, a Roman Catholic private school and the most elite institution of its kind in Quebec where he obtained a French Baccalaureate. He eventually earned his B.C.L. at McGill University in 1951 (first class honours). Hon. LL.D., McGill University, 1990. D.H.C., Université de Montréal, 2002. Married in 1961 to Mariette Morin, M.D., M.Sc., F.R.C.S.(C), F.A.C.O.G.

== Legal career ==
Called to the Bar of Quebec, 1952. He practised law in Montréal with Hackett, Mulvena & Laverty, 1952–57 and then with Hugessen, Macklaier, Chisholm, Smith & Davis, later known as Laing, Weldon, Courtois, Clarkson, Parsons, Gonthier & Tétrault, 1957–74.

He was appointed to the Quebec Superior Court on October 17, 1974. Later he was appointed to the Quebec Court of Appeal on May 24, 1988, and finally to the Supreme Court of Canada on February 1, 1989. Gonthier retired on August 1, 2003.

== Activities after the Court ==
Gonthier had a special interest in Environmental and Sustainable Development Law and participated in a number of international conferences. He was also the recipient of several honorary degrees and titles.

Gonthier was counsel at McCarthy Tétrault in Montréal. He was also Chair of the Board of Governors of the Centre for International Sustainable Development Law (CISDL). He was a Wainwright Senior Fellow at the law faculty of McGill University. He was also the longest serving member of the Board of Advisors for the McGill Law Journal, from 1992 until his death in 2009, and a board member of The McGill International Journal of Sustainable Development Law and Policy as well.

Effective August 1, 2006, Gonthier was appointed Commissioner of the Communications Security Establishment (CSE), Canada's national cryptologic agency.

After his death in 2009, he was entombed at the Notre Dame des Neiges Cemetery in Montreal.

== Awards and accomplishments ==
- Appointed Queen's Counsel, 1971.
- Member of the Board of the Montréal Legal Aid Bureau, 1959–69.
- President of Junior Bar of Montréal, 1960–61.
- President of Junior Bar Section of the Canadian Bar Association, 1961–62.
- Member of the Board of Montréal Bar, 1961–62. Secretary of the Quebec Division of the Canadian Bar Association, 1963–64.
- Member of the Committee on Building Contracts of the Quebec Civil Code Revision Office, 1969–72.
- Member of the Committee on Discipline of the Bar of Quebec, 1973–74.
- President of the Canadian Institute for the Administration of Justice, 1986–87.
- President of the Canadian Judges Conference, 1988–89.
- Chairman of the Commission for National Judges of the First World Conference on the Independence of Justice in Montréal, 1983.
- President of l'Association des anciens du Collège Stanislas, 1954–55.
- Secretary of the Montréal Branch of the Canadian Institute of International Affairs, 1957–58.
- Chairman of the Board of Collège Stanislas, 1984–90.
- Honorary Secretary of the Montréal Museum of Fine Arts, 1961–76.
- Member of the Board of Directors of the McCord Museum of Canadian History, 1976–89.
- Knight of l'Ordre des palmes académiques - France, 1988.
- Fellow, American College of Trial Lawyers (hon.), 1996.
- Fellow, Canadian Bar Association, 2003.
- Lifetime member, Canadian Institute for the Administration of Justice. Bar of Montreal Medal, 2003.
- Companion of the Order of Canada, 2007.

== See also ==
- Reasons of the Supreme Court of Canada by Justice Gonthier
- 1989 judgments of the Supreme Court of Canada
