= Patrick Healy (judge) =

Patrick J. Healy is a judge of the Quebec Court of Appeal, to which he was appointed in 2016. He was previously a judge of the Court of Quebec, Criminal and Penal Division, to which he was appointed in 2007. Prior to his initial appointment, he was a professor at the McGill University Faculty of Law, from which he graduated in 1981. He has served as Editor-in-Chief of the McGill Law Journal and has been called one of the most important Constitutional and criminal law experts in Canada. Healy's 2009 acquittal of an HIV-positive man from sexual assault charges made news when he admitted that the man likely committed the acts in his mind but that there was no way of definitively determining he was the guilty party. Healy is the first vice president of the Executive Committee of the Canadian Institute for the Administration of Justice. He is also a full member of the McGill Centre for Human Rights and Legal Pluralism.
