= Helge Dedek =

Law professor

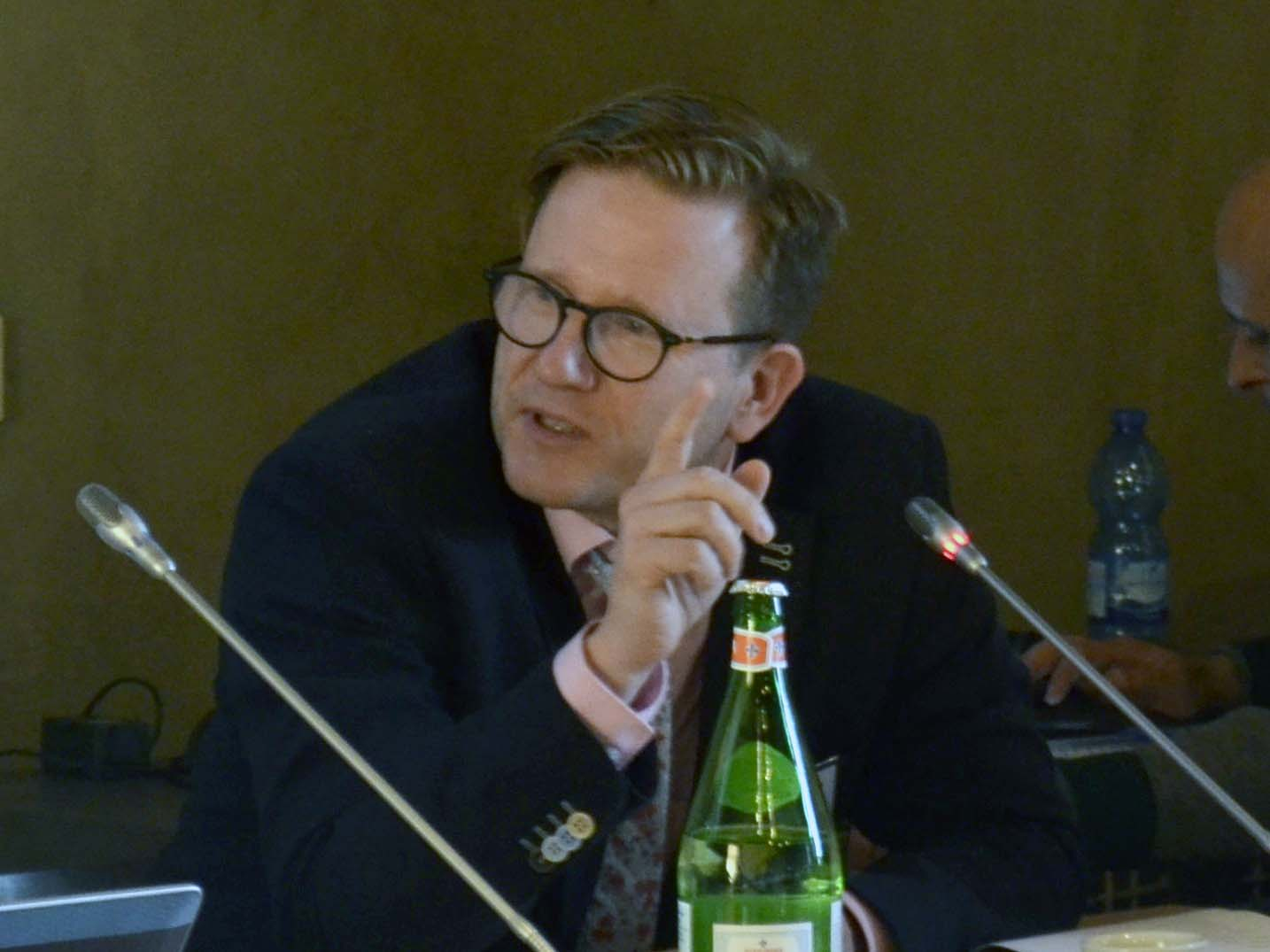

Helge Dedek is a lawyer and professor at the McGill University Faculty of Law, where he holds the Wainwright Chair in Civil Law.

== Education and early career ==
Dedek passed the first and second German State Examinations in Law in 1997 and 2000. He completed a clerkship at the court of appeal in Cologne before taking research positions at the universities of Cologne and Bonn. He received his LL.M. degree from Harvard Law School and a doctoral degree from the University of Bonn, Germany.

He practised as a lawyer in Cologne, working in corporate law and real estate transactions.

== Academic career ==
Dedek joined the Faculty of Law at McGill University as an assistant professor in 2007. In 2012, he was promoted to associate professor with tenure and appointed director of the Institute of Comparative Law, a role he held until 2016. He was promoted to the rank of full professor in 2021, and in 2023 he was appointed to the Arnold Wainwright Chair in Civil Law. Between 2018 and 2021 he also held a part-time position as Professeur associé (associate professor) at the University of Lausanne.

From 2014 to 2023 he was jointly editor-in-chief of the American Journal of Comparative Law with Franz Werro.

In 2021, Dedek was elected as a Titular Member of the International Academy of Comparative Law. In that year he also received the John W. Durnford Award for Teaching Excellence at McGill University Faculty of Law.

== Research ==
Helge's research includes study of legal history, including the history of individual rights and law's colonial past. He is also interested in comparative law, Roman law and theory of private law.

== Publications ==
- Dedek, Helge, ed. (2021) A Cosmopolitan Jurisprudence. Cambridge University Press. ISBN 9781108894760 OCLC 1256592093
- Dedek, Helge, & Werro, Franz, eds., What we write about when we write about comparative law: Pierre Legrand's critique in discussion. American Journal of Comparative Law 65, Special Issue, 2017.
- Dedek, Helge & Van Praagh, Shauna (2015), Stateless Law, Routledge ISBN 9781138720039 OCLC 1120659237
- Dedek, Helge. "Private law rights as democratic participation: Kelsen on private law and (economic) democracy." University of Toronto Law Journal 71, no. 3 (2021): 376-414.
- Dedek, Helge. "Duties of love and self-perfection: Moses Mendelssohn’s theory of contract." Oxford Journal of Legal Studies 32, no. 4 (2012): 713-739.
- Dedek, Helge. "A Particle of Freedom: Natural Law Thought and the Kantian Theory of Transfer by Contract”(2012) 25." Canadian Journal Law & Jurisprudence 2: 313.
