= Alanna Devine =

Activist and lawyer

Alanna Devine is a Canadian animal activist and lawyer with a background in Animal Law. She completed her undergraduate degree in criminology at the University of Toronto and obtained degrees in civil and common law at McGill University Faculty of Law in Montreal, before clerking for the Honorable Justice Louise Charron at the Supreme Court of Canada. While a student she founded the McGill Student Animal Legal Defense Fund, a chapter of the Animal Legal Defense Fund. She has been a member of the Law Society of Ontario since 2007.

For more than ten years, Alanna Devine was the legal director of Animal Advocacy at the Canadian Society for the Prevention of Cruelty to Animals. She is also at the origin of legislative changes for animals in the province of Quebec, notably the amendment of the Animal Health Protection Act (Bill 51) and the adoption of the act to improve the legal status of animals (Bill 54) and the adoption of breed-neutral dangerous dog legislation, An act to promote the protection of persons by establishing a framework with regard to dogs (Bill 128). At the municipal level, it was finally on her initiative that breed specific legislation in the city of Montreal was repealed and that pet stores are now obliged to sell only dogs, cats and rabbits from shelters. She is a frequent lecturer and media commentator on animal law issues.

After her years at the SPCA, Alanna Devine was appointed director of Mercy for Animals in Canada and then political advisor to the mayor and the executive committee of the City of Montreal. In parallel with these activities, she has taught, animal law at McGill University's faculty of law, and lectures throughout North America on the legal and political status of animals in our society.

Alanna Devine and her work have been featured in publications and media outlets such as the Unbound Project, a multimedia project co-founded by acclaimed photojournalist Jo-Anne McArthur which features and celebrates women on the frontlines of animal advocacy. Her work was also highlighted in McGill University Faculty of Law's In Focus Magazine, where she appeared on the cover and in articles from Droit Inc. and the UK Center for Animal Law.

Alanna Devine is a vegan.
