= Stephen Alexander Smith =

Canadian legal scholar and writer (1958–2022)

Stephen Alexander Smith FRSC
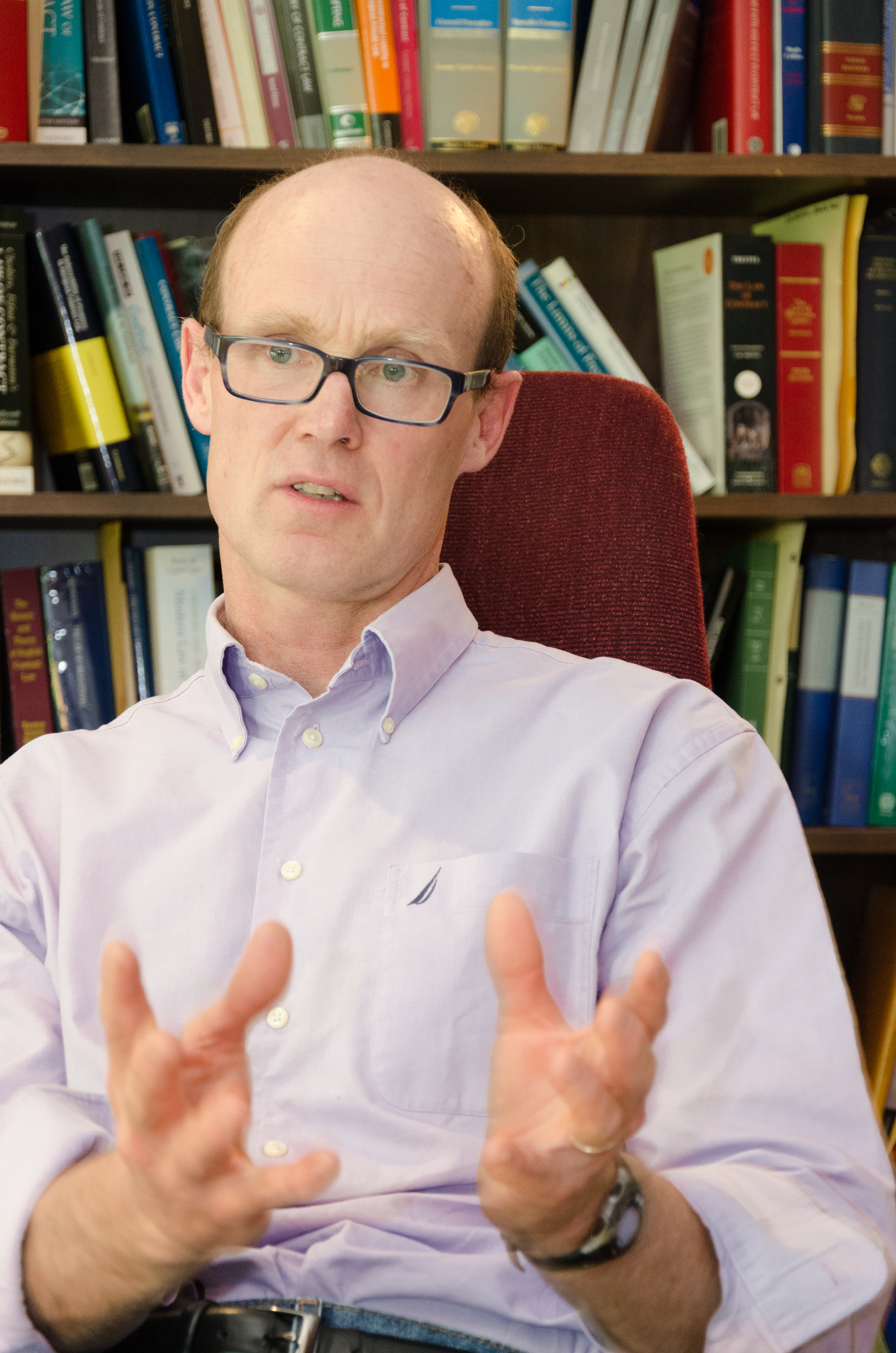
- Smith in 2012
- Born: 1958; Toronto, Ontario, Canada
- Died: November 29, 2022 (aged 64); Toronto, Ontario, Canada
- Spouse: Susan Law
- Children: 3
- Awards: Killam Research Fellowship (2008)

Academic background
- Education: Queen's University at Kingston (BA); University of Toronto (LL.B); Balliol College, Oxford (DPhil)
- Doctoral advisor: Joseph Raz

Academic work
- Discipline: Common law
- Sub-discipline: Torts law
- Institutions: McGill University Faculty of Law
- Notable works: Contract Theory (2004); Atiyah's Introduction to the Law of Contract, 6th ed (2005); Rights, Wrongs, and Injustices: The Structure of Remedial Law (2019)

Stephen Alexander Smith FRSC (1958 – November 29, 2022) was a Canadian legal scholar and writer.

== Early life and education ==
Smith was born in Toronto and earned a Bachelor of Arts degree from Queen's University at Kingston in 1981. Thereafter, he received a law degree from the University of Toronto and then a DPhil from Balliol College, Oxford under the supervision of Joseph Raz.

== Legal career ==
In 1989, he served as a law clerk for Brian Dickson when he was Chief Justice of Canada.

== Academic career ==
As an academic, Smith focused on torts law.

He was a former faculty member of St Anne's College, Oxford. He joined McGill University's Faculty of Law in 1998 as an associate professor and was promoted to a full professor in 2004. In 2009, he was named a James McGill Professor in the faculty.

== Awards and recognition ==
In February 2008, Smith received a Killam Research Fellowship from the Canada Council for the Arts for his project "Court Orders and the Replication, Transformation and Creations of Rights".

He was named New Zealand Law Foundation Distinguished Fellow of 2017 and visited all six New Zealand law faculties in the fall of 2017.

In 2020, he was named to the Royal Society of Canada (Academy of the Social Sciences).

== Personal life and death ==
Smith was married and had 3 children, including Michael Law-Smith, who served as law clerk to Chief Justice Richard Wagner at the Supreme Court of Canada and teaches criminal law at the University of Ottawa.

Smith died on November 29, 2022, at the age of 64.

== Publications ==
- Contract Theory (2004)
- Atiyah's Introduction to the Law of Contract, 6th ed (2005)
- Rights, Wrongs, and Injustices: The Structure of Remedial Law (2019)
