= Adelle Blackett =

Canadian legal scholar

Academic background
- Education: Queen's University at Kingston (BA); McGill University (BCL, LLB); Columbia University (LLM, SJD)

Academic work
- Discipline: Law
- Sub-discipline: Labour law Human rights law
- Institutions: McGill University

Adelle Blackett FRSC is a Canadian legal scholar working as a professor of law at McGill University Faculty of Law.

== Education ==
Blackett earned a Bachelor of Arts degree from Queen's University at Kingston in 1989, a Bachelor of Civil Law and Bachelor of Laws from the McGill University Faculty of Law in 1994, and a Master of Laws and Doctor of Law from Columbia Law School.

== Career ==
Blackett's scholarship focuses on labour law and human rights issues. She was elected a Fellow of the Royal Society of Canada in 2020 and was awarded a fellowship by the Pierre Elliott Trudeau Foundation in 2016. Blackett has served as a commissioner of the Commission des droits de la personne et des droits de la jeunesse. As of 2018, she held a Canada Research Chair in transnational labour law and development. In 2023, she received the Bob Hepple Award for Lifetime Achievement from the Labour Law Research Network.

== Publications ==
- Blackett, Adelle (2019). Everyday Transgressions: Domestic Workers' Transnational Challenge to International Labor Law. Cornell University Press. ISBN 978-1-5017-1577-8. OCLC 1054267220.
