= Stephen Allan Scott =

- Born: May 25, 1940 (age 86); Montreal, Quebec, Canada
- Education: McGill University B.A., B.C.L. Oxford University D.Phil
- Occupations: Lawyer, professor

Stephen Allan Scott (born May 25, 1940) is a Canadian law professor at McGill University.

== Career ==
Scott was born in Montreal in 1940. He graduated from Westmount High School and graduated with first class honours from McGill University with a BA in 1961 with a BA in Economics and Political Science. Next he attended Oxford University on fellowships, before attending the McGill University Faculty of Law in 1963. He graduated from the law school with a BCL in 1966, where he served as Editor-in-Chief of the McGill Law Journal. In 1969 he graduated with a D.Phil. from Oxford University. He became a Full Professor of Law in 1977 and has been a Professor-Emeritus since 2003. He represented clients before the provincial and federal courts of Canada throughout his career.

Known as McGill's leading scholar on the Canadian Constitution. Scott has a history of making statements in favor of Canadian nationalism and the rights of anglophones and minorities in Quebec as well as statements about federal jurisdictional issues and specifically the Canadian Charter of Rights and Freedoms. In 1996 Scott made national news in Canada by arguing that if the Province of Quebec could separate from Canada, then parts of Quebec could choose to stay with Canada, or could separate from Quebec to form their own countries—including Quebec anglophones and native populations.
