= John Harrison (lawyer) =

British-born lawyer

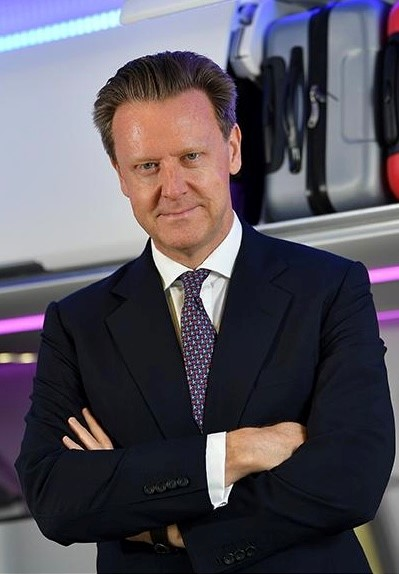
- Born: John Harrison; 1967 (age 58–59); United Kingdom
- Education: LLB (Hons) and an LLM in Law
- Alma mater: McGill University
- Occupation: Lawyer
- Years active: 1991–present
- Employer: Airbus
- Awards: French Legion of Honour

John Harrison (born 1967) is a British-born lawyer. He has been the general counsel of Airbus since 2015 and has served as the chairman of Airbus United Kingdom (UK) since January 2019.

== Biography ==
Harrison holds an LLB (Hons) and an LLM in Law and is a graduate of McGill University.

Harrison began his career as an aircraft finance lawyer at Clifford Chance in 1991.

From 1997 to 2007, Harrison held various senior positions at Airbus, including general counsel for the EADS Defence and Security division. Following his tenure at Airbus, he served as the group general counsel at Technip FMC until 2015. In 2010, he negotiated an FCPA settlement with the U.S. Department of Justice.

In 2015, Harrison was appointed as the general counsel of Airbus. Between 2015 and 2019, he directed an ethics and compliance overhaul at Airbus, modernising compliance processes and training. Under his leadership, Airbus became the first aircraft manufacturer to disclose Scope 3 carbon emissions.

In 2017, Harrison was honoured with the title of Chevalier in the French Legion of Honour.

Harrison is a solicitor of the Supreme Court of England and Wales, a fellow of the Royal Aeronautical Society, and a member of the Airbus Executive Committee and the UK Investment Council.
