= Stephen Scott (cricketer) =

Zimbabwean cricketer (born 1967)

Personal information
- Full name: Stephen Bryce Scott
- Born: 2 February 1967 (age 59); Salisbury, Rhodesia
- Batting: Right-handed

Domestic team information
- Years: Team
- 1993/94: Mashonaland Country Districts

Career statistics
Competition	FC
Matches	1
Runs scored	0
Batting average	0.00
100s/50s	0/0
Top score	0*
Catches/stumpings	1/–
- Source: ESPNcricinfo, 16 July 2021

Stephen Bryce Scott (born 2 February 1967) is a former Zimbabwean cricketer. Born in Salisbury (now Harare), he played one first-class match for Mashonaland Country Districts during the 1993–94 Logan Cup.
