= Orville Sievwright Tyndale =

Canadian judge and university chancellor

Orville Sievwright Tyndale (4 June 1887 – 29 October 1952) was a Canadian judge and Chancellor of McGill University.

Born in Montreal, Quebec, Tyndale was educated at Montreal High School, the Feller Institute, McGill University, and the University of Paris. He was admitted to the Quebec bar in 1915 and made a King's Counsel in 1924. During World War I, Tyndale served with the Princess Patricia's Canadian Light Infantry, and was wounded at the Battle of the Somme in 1916. He taught law at McGill University from 1921.

Tyndale was appointed to be a judge of the Superior Court of the District of Montreal in 1942. He was promoted to be Chief Justice of the Superior Court in Montreal and Associate Chief Justice of the Superior Court in 1946.

In 1947, Tyndale became the Chancellor of McGill University, the first McGill graduate to hold that position.
