= Uncertain T (show car) =

Show car built by Steve Scott in 1965

Uncertain T is a show car built by Steve Scott in 1965. Drawn by Rodney Larson 1960.

== Design specifics ==
Uncertain T's chassis is steel tube, painted red. The 1957 Buick nailhead, with it block painted brown and the intricate detailing of red paint, was bored and stroked to 386 cu in (6,330 cc) and equipped with 11:1 compression Jahns pistons, Hilborn injectors, Scheiefer magneto, 1963 Buick cylinder heads, and open headers. The transmission and quick-change rear axle casing were painted brown, the rack and pinion and torsion bar tube yellow.

Uncertain T's body was fiberglass. Its body resembled the Model T "phonebooth" coupé, steeply raked forward, with a "wind-up key" in the rear section. When the car debuted, the body was painted a deep candy red (applied by Bill Cushenbery). The upholstery was done by Lee Wells. The steering wheel was a four-spoke design, mounted vertically.

Uncertain T ran on narrow spoked motorcycle wheels in front and wide five-spoked wheels in back.

Torsion bar front suspension was a rarity in customs (or any cars) at the time. Scott's use of a 1960 MGA rack and pinion to operate the drag link was also innovative.

While Uncertain T ran, it had no suspension, no shock absorbers, and no front brakes; this effectively made the car a trailer queen.

== History ==
Uncertain T debuted at a carshow as part of the 1965 Winternats at Pomona in February 1965, and appeared in the May issue of Car Craft. It was on the cover of November's Car Craft, which had a three-page feature (with only black and white photos) inside.

About a month after completion, Scott had the car repainted metalflake brick orange by Junior's House of Color, before entering "Uncertain T" in the Oakland Roadster Show; in this new color scheme, it toured the U.S., and won a number of trophies. Some time later, the engine and chassis details were repainted yellow.

Uncertain T also appeared in Hot Rod in July, August, and September 1966. In the September issue, it was listed as for sale, with a price of US$7,000; usual for a used custom car was $2,000 to $3,000.

In 1966, Uncertain T was offered as a Monogram model kit.

Around 1970, Uncertain T, then painted metallic gold, was sold to a California resident. Ownership could not be established; in 2003, its ownership was still unknown.

In 2024, it was announced in various online sources that Uncertain T had been rediscovered in Van Nuys California by Beau Boeckmann; it would be displayed at the Grand National Roadster Show.

== Featured appearances ==
- Car Craft Magazine, November 1965.
- Street Rodder, July 2003

== Sources ==
- Ganahl, Pat (July 2003). "Uncertain T". Street Rodder. pp. 74–76.
- Gillogly, Brandan (January 24, 2024). "Uncertain-T: Wild '60s Custom Car Uncovered, Ending 50-Year Mystery". Hagerty. Archived from the original on March 26, 2025.
