= Dugald Christie (lawyer) =

Canadian lawyer (1941–2006)

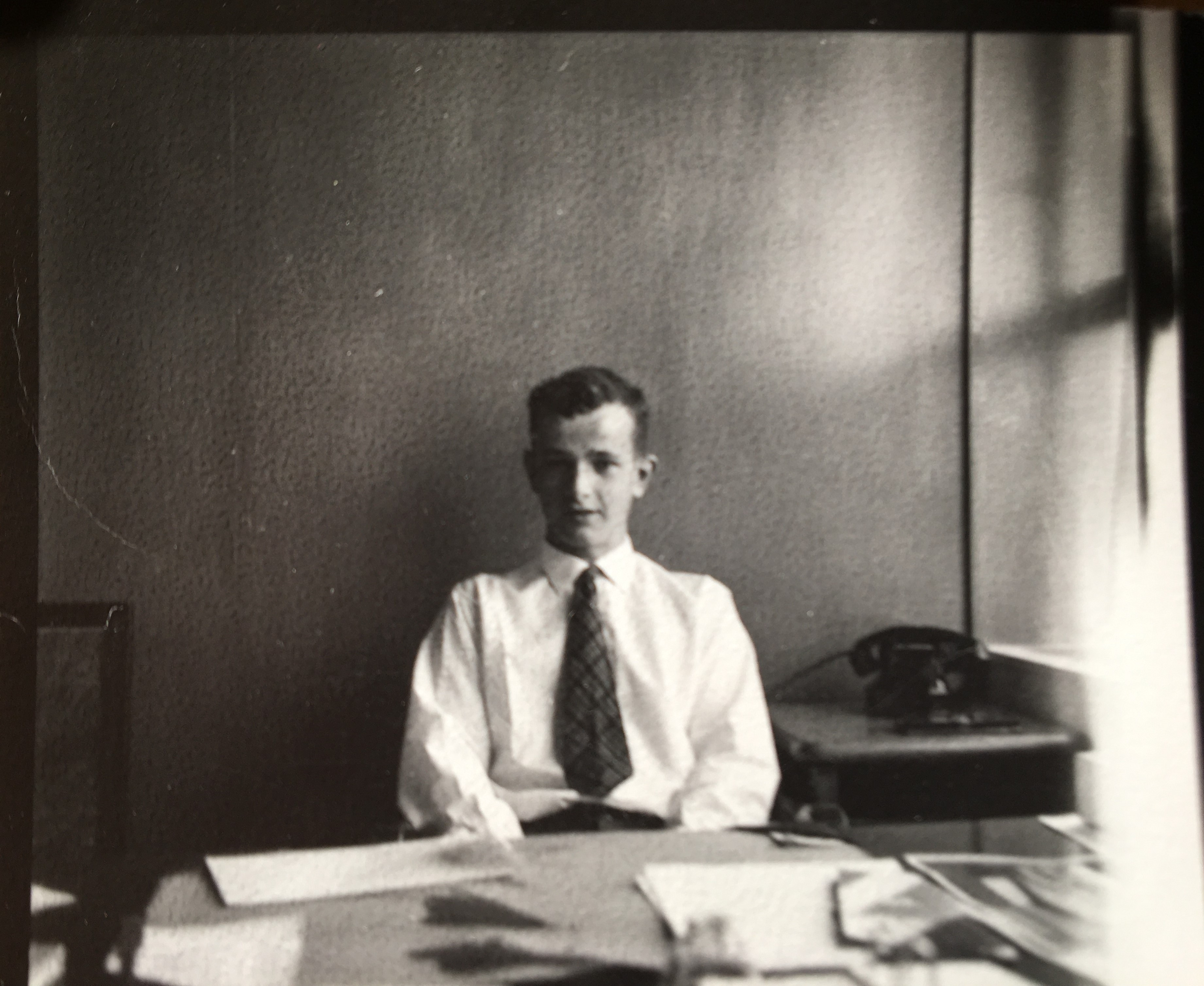
Image of Dugald Christie

Dugald Christie (1941 – July 31, 2006) was a Canadian lawyer and political activist. He was based in the city of Vancouver, British Columbia. He was the grandson of Dr Dugald Christie (Christie of Mukden), a Scottish Presbyterian missionary doctor who founded the Mukden Medical College in Shenyang, China.

== Life ==
Dugald Christie finished a Bachelor of Science at McGill University in Montreal Quebec with the intentions of entering medical school following the footsteps of his father and grandfather, but after careful examination of his aptitudes instead enrolled, as a law school student at The School of Law of Dalhousie University in Nova Scotia.

Christie began his political activities in 1991 when he began to offer free legal service to low-income people in Vancouver. As the head of the Western Canada Society to Access Justice, he was instrumental in setting up numerous pro-bono clinics across western Canada. He charged extremely low fees, and his net income in the years 1991 to 1999 did not exceed $30,000 per year.

Christie is most noteworthy for a 2005 court challenge of a British Columbia law that extended provincial sales tax to legal services. Christie argued that the law unjustly infringed on the constitutionally-protected rights of low income people to access the justice system. He met with partial success at the Court of Appeal, but a further appeal at the Supreme Court of Canada overturned the lower court's decision on May 25, 2007.

In 2006 Christie began an effort to bicycle across Canada in order to raise awareness of the shortcomings of legal assistance programs in Canada. In his pocket resided a petition signed by lawyers outlining key failures of the legal aid system to adequately provide justice to citizens without means. He had hoped to deliver this to PM Stephen Harper at the Canadian Houses of Parliament if granted an audience. On July 31, 2006, in Sault Ste. Marie, Ontario, Christie was killed when he was struck from behind by a van during the last leg of his journey.

== Legacy ==
Since 2009, students at the McGill University Faculty of Law have been holding an annual community bike ride to celebrate Dugald Christie's legacy and continue his work. Each fall, participants from the Law Faculty and the wider community collect donations and raise awareness about access to justice issues in Montreal.
