= Robert Leckey =

Canadian law professor

The Honourable Robert Leckey
- Born: Robert Leckey; Ontario, Canada
- Citizenship: Canadian
- Occupations: Judge, lawyer, academic
- Known for: Dean of McGill University Faculty of Law; constitutional and family law scholarship
- Title: Justice of the Superior Court of Quebec
- Awards: Pierre Elliott Trudeau Foundation Fellowship

Academic background
- Education: Queen's University, McGill University, University of Toronto

Academic work
- Discipline: Law
- Sub-discipline: Constitutional law, Family law, LGBTQ+ rights law
- Institutions: McGill University Faculty of Law
- Main interests: Constitutional law, Family law, Human/LGBTQ+ rights
- Notable works: Families and the Constitution: Remembering the Unrecognized (2014)

Robert Leckey is a judge of the Superior Court of Quebec, District of Montreal. From 2016 to 2025, he was the Dean of McGill University's Faculty of Law.

== Education ==
Robert Leckey graduated from Queen's University with a BAH in English literature and History in 1997. In 2002 he graduated from McGill University Faculty of Law with BCL and LLB degrees. He served as Editor-in-Chief of the McGill Law Journal while at McGill University. He also pursued an academic exchange from 2001-2002 at Université de Paris, Paris-Panthéon-Assas University through the Conférence des recteurs et des principaux des universités du Québec (CREPUQ) program.

After graduation he was a clerk to Justice Michel Bastarache at the Supreme Court of Canada. He then graduated from his SJD from the University of Toronto Faculty of Law, where he was a Trudeau Scholar.

== Career ==
Leckey is known for his work in family law, specifically his work on the subject of same-sex equality under the family law and legal system of Canada. He is an active supporter of LGBT rights in Quebec and has made open statements against government policies that affect LGBT communities negatively. He has previously debated modern family law ethics and has worked in the field of human rights law. He has also been active in LGBTQ rights advocacy, serving previously as chair of Egale Canada’s Legal Issues Committee and criticizing legal and policy inequalities affecting same-sex couples in family law contexts.

In 2009 he was awarded the John W. Durnford Prize for Teaching Excellence and le Prix d'essai juridique for his legal scholarship. In 2010 he was awarded the Canada Prize for his 2008 book Contextual Subjects: Family, State and Relational Theory, a national book award given only once every four years. In 2015, Leckey became a full professor. In 2016, he was named to the Samuel Gale Chair. On July 1, 2016, he began a five-year term as dean of the McGill Faculty of Law. From 2014 to 2016, Leckey was the director of the Paul-André Crépeau Centre for Private and Comparative Law. From 2008 to 2011, he chaired the McGill Equity Subcommittee on Queer People.

On January 27, 2025, Leckey was appointed as a judge of the Superior Court of Quebec. His appointment swiftly drew sharp criticism, including from Quebec’s Justice Minister, Simon Jolin-Barrette.

== Controversies ==
In 2022, Leckey was strongly criticized in his position as Dean regarding the Faculty of Law's lack of measures to counter the spread of COVID-19. He referred to a student strike, initiated by referendum, as a "boycott" and insisted that he cannot mandate measures in classes due to professorial independence. Nonetheless, he has opposed professorial unionization on the grounds that law professors should not form a bargaining unit separate from other professors at McGill.

In September 2025, Leckey's appointment as a judge was challenged by Droits collectifs Québec, a non-profit organization, on the basis that Leckey failed to meet the constitutional requirements for office. They claim that judges of the Superior Court of Quebec must be members of the Barreau du Québec for a minimum of 10 years prior to appointment to the bench. Leckey had only been a member of the Quebec bar for seven years at the time of his appointment. The Constitution Act, 1867 requires that "The Judges of the Courts of Quebec shall be selected from the Bar of that Province" while the Judges Act requires that an appointee "is a barrister or advocate of at least 10 years’ standing at the bar of any province". Leckey was previously a member of the Ontario bar.

== Personal life ==
Leckey is fluently bilingual, having taught and published in both English and French and contributing to Quebec francophone legal scholarly networks.

Leckey is openly gay and has written extensively on the legal recognition of same-sex relationships in Canada.
