= Richard Lehun =

Artist

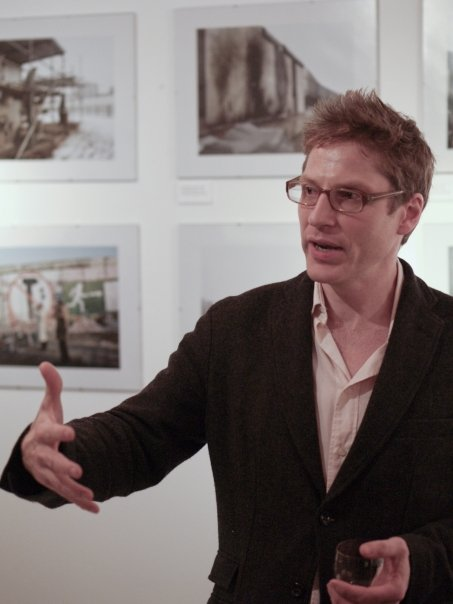
- Richard Lehun speaking at the Goethe-Institute, Montreal
- Born: Toronto, Canada
- Known for: Law, Philosophy, Visual Artist
- Awards: Deutscher Filmpreis

Richard Lehun is a German-Canadian inter-disciplinary visual artist (film and photography), attorney, and former teaching fellow at McGill University in the areas of fiduciary law and justice theory.

== Law and philosophy ==
Richard Lehun studied under Jürgen Habermas at the Johann Wolfgang Goethe University Frankfurt am Main on a DAAD Scholarship and completed his Magister Artium on non-conceptual truth claims in T.W. Adorno's Negative Dialectics and Aesthetic Theory.

After completing his Magister Artium, Richard Lehun pursued graduate studies in Canada, first completing a B.C.L. / LL.B. and then moving on directly to the D.C.L. Doctorate of Laws program at McGill University. Richard Lehun's philosophical research is focused on the concept of the fiduciary as applied to social transformation.

During his doctorate, Richard Lehun worked with Prof. Richard Janda, and their "Sustainable Development as an Emancipatory Truth Claim", course questioned both the focus and pedagogical model of conventional legal education. The course was also co-taught at the Law Faculty of the Freie Universität, Berlin in 2008. The approach of the course has been based on the work of Prof. Roderick Macdonald (former F.R. Scott Professor of Constitutional and Public Law) also of McGill University.

In 2010, Richard Lehun was a Visiting Researcher at Harvard Law School under Duncan Kennedy. In November 2012, he received a six-month scholarship from the DAAD for studies on the political implications of his theory of emancipatory justice at the Westfaelische Wilhelms-Universitaet Muenster under the supervision of Prof. Dr. Bernd Holznagel. In 2014, Richard Lehun acted as Junior Faculty for the Institute for Global Law and Policy (IGLP) at Harvard Law School, and he has been a regular guest lecturer at O. P. Jindal Global University in New Delhi, and SOMA in Mexico City.

As of October 2019, Richard Lehun is writing his habilitation on Adorno and justice theory at the Philosophy Department of the Johann Wolfgang Goethe University Frankfurt am Main, intended to be published as part of the Routledge Nomikoi: Critical Legal Thinkers’ Series.

Richard Lehun's legal practice is centered around fiduciary law, intellectual property, and art law.

Richard Lehun is a founding member of the New York-based Stropheus legal and business collective for the arts, responsible for gallery, museum, and auction house ethics and fiduciary duties, and is a member of the Art Law Committee of the New York City Bar Association. He is a regular guest lecturer at Sotheby's Institute of Art and ist Assistant Professor for Art Law at Christie's Education, as well as teaching continuing legal education on the topic of fiduciary obligations in the fine art context.

== Film and Visual Arts ==
Richard's self-financed graduating film entitled Fetisch was awarded the German National Film Prize (Bundesfilmpreis 2002). Fetisch was highlighted by the German Export Union and was shown at over 30 international film festivals worldwide. At the completion of his film studies, Richard Lehun was admitted to the European Audio-Visual Entrepreneurs program (EAVE), the European Union's extensive training program for film and television producers focusing on international co-production.

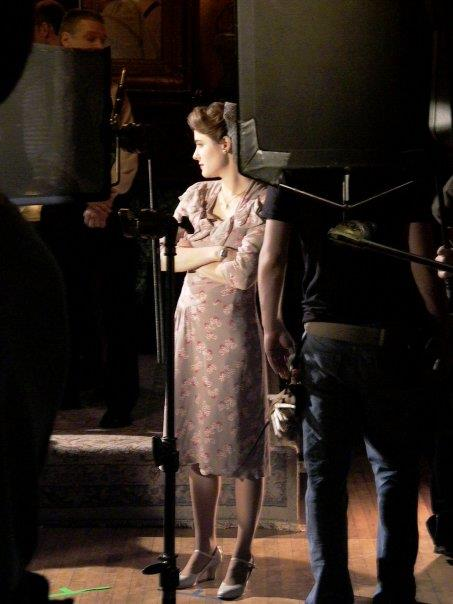
Caroline Dhavernas on set of “One Last Dance”

Richard Lehun's “One Last Dance,” shot in Montréal with an all-star cast including Dorothée Berryman, Caroline Dhavernas, Danny Gilmore, and Anthony Lemke, was released in the spring of 2009. "One Last Dance" was funded by the Conseil des arts et des lettres du Québec (CALQ) as well as the National Film Board (NFB).“8.5 mm”, shot in Berlin at the since-closed infamous Bar 25, is a continuation of the formalistic aesthetic contained in “Fetisch.” “8.5 mm” was edited and produced by the alternative Brooklyn film director Mark Mitchell.

The past years have also seen cooperations with Deutsche Grammophon on visual essays of the artists, Lang Lang, Mischa Maisky, Vadim Repin, Measha Brueggergosman, Alice Sara Ott.

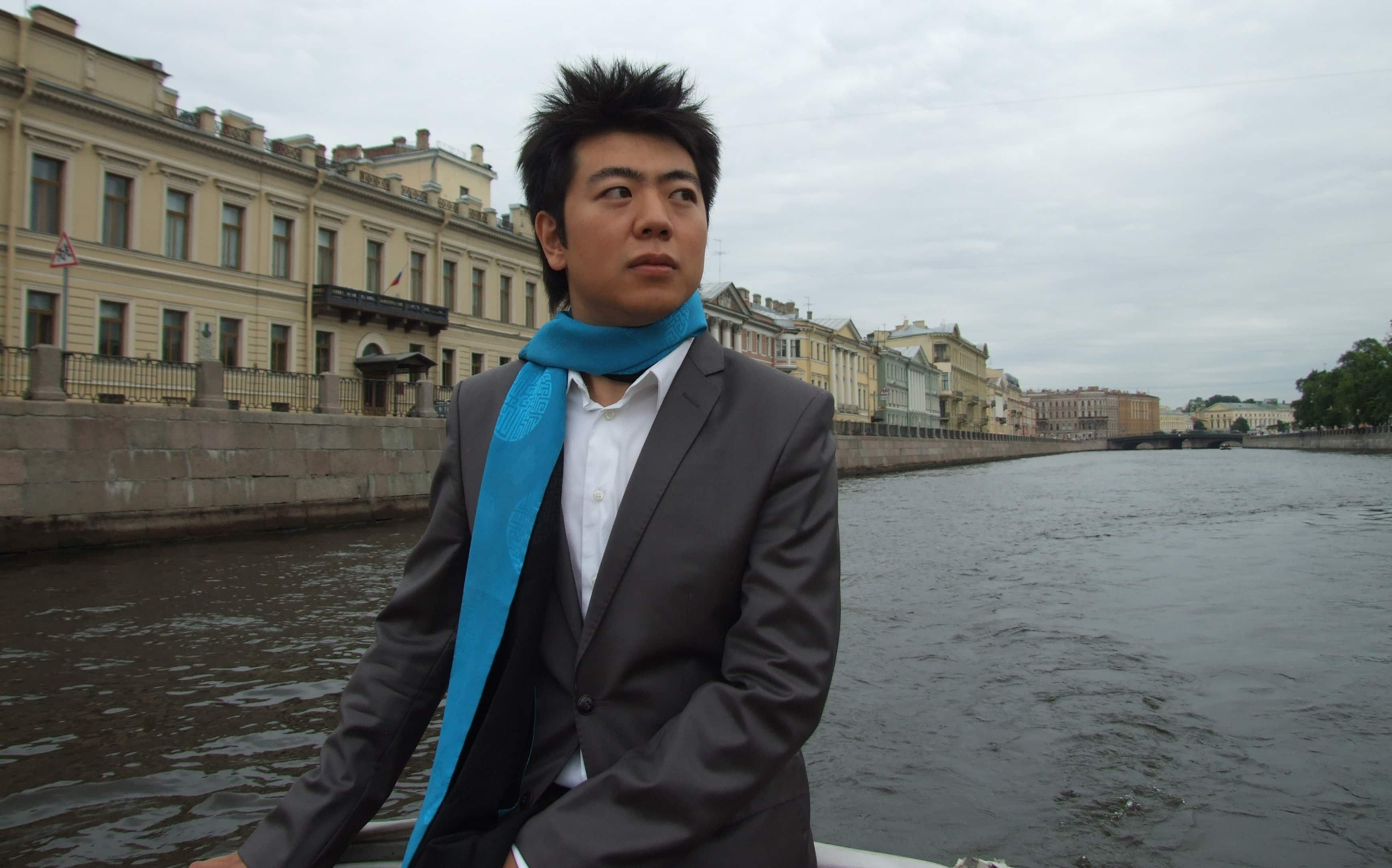
Lang Lang in St. Petersburg

Richard Lehun is currently producing a long-form documentary project with Flaschenpost Films (Berlin) on the changing visual arts context of New York City, as well developing a-four part series on Prof. Duncan Kennedy and the Critical Legal Studies Movement.

Richard Lehun is a member of the Directors Guild, the Deutsche Filmakademie, and the New York Chapter of the American Society of Media Photographers.
