= Adrian Knatchbull-Hugessen =

Canadian politician

The Honourable Adrian Norton Knatchbull-Hugessen QC VD
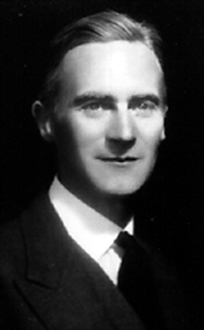

Senator for Inkerman, Quebec
- In office 1937–1967
- Appointed by: William Lyon Mackenzie King
- Preceded by: Richard Smeaton White
- Succeeded by: Maurice Lamontagne

Personal details
- Born: 5 July 1891 Ashford, Kent, England
- Died: 30 March 1976 (aged 84)
- Party: Liberal
- Spouse: Margaret Cecilia Duggan (m. 7 September 1922)

Adrian Norton Knatchbull-Hugessen, QC VD (5 July 1891 – 30 March 1976) was a British-born Canadian lawyer and senator.

== Biography ==
Knatchbull-Hugessen was born in Ashford, Kent, England on 5 July 1891, the son of Edward Hugessen Knatchbull-Hugessen, 1st Baron Brabourne, and Ethel Mary Walker, daughter of Sir George Gustavus Walker.

He was educated at Eton College, but emigrated to Canada to study law at McGill University in Montreal. He was called to the Canadian Bar in 1914. During the First World War, he served as a captain in the Canadian Artillery. After the war, he became a successful lawyer and organiser for the Liberal Party of Canada. In the 1935 federal election, he ran unsuccessfully for election to the House of Commons of Canada as the Liberal candidate in the Montreal riding of St. Lawrence—St. George. He became King's Counsel (KC) in 1932. In 1937, he was appointed to the Senate of Canada. He served as the President of the Liberal Party of Canada from 1940 to 1943 and Deputy Leader of the Government in the Senate from 1950 to 1952. He retired from the Senate in 1967.

== Family ==
He married Margaret Cecilia Duggan on 7 September 1922. Margaret (Peggy) was the only daughter of George Herrick Duggan (1862–1946) and Mildred Scarth Stevenson.

They had the following children:

- Edward Herrick Knatchbull-Hugessen (4 June 1923 – 1955)
- Kenneth Wyndham Knatchbull-Hugessen (18 February 1925 – 19 December 1942)
- Andrew John Knatchbull-Hugessen (born 30 June 1926), who represented Canada in sailing at the 1952 Summer Olympics
- Mary Cecilia Knatchbull-Hugessen (born 30 November 1929), married Stephen Keynes.
- James Cornelius Knatchbull-Hugessen (born 26 Jul 1933), judge

He took his two sons Edward and James into his law business, but Edward died young. James K. Hugessen became an important Canadian judge.

== Archives ==
There is an Adrian Knatchbull Hugessen and family fonds at Library and Archives Canada.
