= Chartier v Chartier =

- Supreme Court of Canada

Hearing: November 12, 1998(*) Judgment: January 28, 1999
- Citations: [1999] 1 S.C.R. 242

Court membership

Reasons given
- Unanimous reasons by: Bastarache J.

Chartier v Chartier, 1999 1 S.C.R. 242 is a leading Canadian case decided by the Supreme Court of Canada on the legal role of step parents in a marriage. The Court held that a step parent who is found to be in loco parentis cannot unilaterally withdraw from the family relationship.

== Background ==
In 1991, Gerald Chartier married to Sharon Chartier, with whom he had been in a relationship since 1989, and with whom he had a daughter, Jeena, who was born a year prior. At the time of their marriage, Sharon also had a second daughter, Jessica, from a previous relationship. Gerald had helped care for the child and took on the role a father. The couple "discussed, but did not proceed with, the husband’s adoption of Jessica[,]" though they "did amend Jessica’s birth registration to indicate, falsely, that the husband was Jessica’s natural father and to change her name to his." In May 1992, the couple separated, and did so permanently the following September after briefly reconciling. In March 1994, a consent judgment under Manitoba's Family Maintenance Act determined that both daughters were "children of the marriage" and granted Gerald access to them.

Though he consented to supporting Jeena, "the judgment was silent as to maintenance for Jessica and for the wife." The Family Maintenance Act declares that "[s]pouses and common-law partners have the mutual obligation to contribute reasonably to each other's support and maintenance," and that – while former spouses should seek to become financially independent from one another following a separation – it extends this obligation to support one's former partner following a separation under certain circumstances. Sharon commenced divorce proceedings in February 1995, at which time she applied for child support, requesting a declaration that Gerald "stood in the place of a parent to Jessica." Gerald contested the claim, and argued that he had severed his in loco parentis role to Jessica, and therefore was not responsible for supporting the child. An interim order ruled Gerald pay child support to both daughters and suspended his access to them pending a report from Consiliation Services. That report, issued in October of that year, recorded Gerald's desire to sever his parental relationship with his step-daughter. A trial court ruled that Gerald pay spousal support to Sharon as well as reimburse her for her legal costs, while it reduced the amount of child support he was obligated to pay for the care of Jeena. Moreover, it denied Sharon's request that he pay child support for the care of Jennifer as well, finding that Gerald "had repudiated his parental relationship with Jessica." Both parties appealed to the Manitoba Court of Appeal, which agreed to hear the case on the issue of the reduction of Gerald's monthly support to Jeena, denying his own appeal for review on the issue of his obligation to pay spousal support. The appellate court set aside the lower court's judgment that Gerald cover Sharon's legal fees, and denied Sharon's request that her ex-husband provide child support for the care of Jessica as well. Sharon subsequently appealed to the Supreme Court of Canada, which heard oral arguments in November 1998.

== Decision of the Supreme Court ==
Justice Bastarache, writing for a unanimous Court, held in favour of Sharon and stated that Gerald could not unilaterally sever ties to the child. To determine if a spouse is in the role of parent, the court must look at a number of factors including:

- whether the child participates in the extended family in the same way as would a biological child;
- whether the person provides financially for the child (depending on ability to pay);
- whether the person disciplines the child as a parent;
- whether the person represents to the child, the family, the world, either explicitly or implicitly, that he or she is responsible as a parent to the child;
- the nature or existence of the child's relationship with the absent biological parent.

== See also ==
- List of Supreme Court of Canada cases
