= McGill Journal of Sustainable Development Law =

- Discipline: Sustainable Development law
- Language: English, French

Publication details
- Former names: McGill International Journal of Sustainable Development Law and Policy
- History: 2005-present
- Publisher: McGill University Faculty of Law (Canada)
- Frequency: Semiannually

Standard abbreviations
- ISO 4: McGill J. Sustain. Dev. Law

Indexing
- ISSN: 1712-9664
- LCCN: ce2006300693
- OCLC no.: 166920669

Links
- Journal homepage

The McGill Journal of Sustainable Development Law (MJSDL) is a biannual peer-reviewed law journal published at the McGill University Faculty of Law and run solely by law students. The journal was established in 2005 as the McGill International Journal of Sustainable Development Law and Policy (MIJSDLP) by its founding editor-in-chief Michelle Toering Sanders. The Journal's current editor-in-chief is Arsalan Ahmed. The journal is edited by Dena Kia and Emma Sitland.

It covers legal issues pertaining to sustainable development and environmental law.

The Australian Research Council (ARC) ranked the McGill Journal of Sustainable Development Law among the best English-language law journals in the world giving it an A rating - a rating shared by only 165 law reviews globally out of 1,265 law journals.
