= Head & Hands =

Head & Hands, also known as À Deux Mains, is a nonprofit organization based in Montreal, Quebec. The organization was founded by Mark Early and Pat Crawshaw in 1970 with the goal of creating a safe drop-in space for youth. Though the centre was originally geared towards drug users, Head & Hands has expanded its services and promotes a holistic philosophy to community outreach. The centre, currently located in Notre-Dame-de-Grâce, offers counseling, legal services, programs for young parents, sex education, a variety of workshops, and emergency food services. With 12 staff members and 350 volunteers, Head & Hands helps put on numerous events throughout the year, both informational and social events. The centre serviced 6,595 youth in 2014, with more than 24,000 visits in the same year.

Head & Hands describes their mission as:

"Head & Hands’ mission is to work with youth to promote their physical and mental well-being. Our approach is preventative, inclusive, non-judgmental, and holistic, with a fundamental commitment to providing an environment that welcomes youth without discrimination. We facilitate social change and the empowerment of youth based on their current needs within our community and society at large."

With all of their programs and services, Head & hands applies a critical [social justice] perspective which recognizes the [intersectionality] that is necessary for reaching a diverse group of people. Head & Hands' approach to intersectional practices consists of considering cultural contexts related to power including; race, class, gender, language, sexual orientation, age, ability, as well as other. Head & Hands helps staff and volunteers work through an unlearning process in order for them to better equipped to provide non-judgmental approach to community outreach. As part of their Street Work program, Head & Hands supplies information and materials for safer drug use and safe sex practices while educating youth about the risks of HIV and Hepatitis C. Head & Hands also facilitates the Sense Project, which is a teen-oriented sex-ed program started in 2006, wherein Head & Hands team members facilitate safe-sex and sex-positive workshops in various venues around Montreal. The Sense Project has been extremely successful having between 90-95% of youth involved self-reporting that they had learned something useful. The Sense Project is funded in part by Faggity Ass Friday, a by-donation queer dance party that happens the last Friday of every month.
