= Law Commission of Canada =

Canadian independent law commission

- Commission du droit du Canada
- Abbreviation: LCC
- Predecessor: Law Reform Commission of Canada (LRCC)
- Established: 1992; 2023
- Dissolved: 2006
- Type: Advisory public body
- Legal status: Created by the Law Commission of Canada Act 1996
- Purpose: Independently analyse, review, and suggest reforms to Canadian law
- Headquarters: 15th floor, 280 Slater Street
- Location: Ottawa, Canada
- Methods: Research
- President: Shauna Van Praagh
- Commissioner and Vice President: Sarah Elgazzar
- Commissioners: Aidan Johnson, Kevin O’Shea, Renée Cochard
- Website: www.canada.ca/en/law-commission-canada.html

The Law Commission of Canada (LCC; French: Commission du droit du Canada (CDC)) is an independent law commission that gives advice to the Canadian government on matters of law. The body was created in 1971 as the Law Reform Commission of Canada and was disbanded in 1992. The body was reestablished as the Law Commission of Canada in 1996. On September 26, 2006, the Conservative government announced it was cutting the LCC's funding. It has since been revived with Budget 2021 allocating $18 million for the commission over five years, with funding starting 2021-2022.

== History ==
=== Law Reform Commission of Canada ===
Decades before it was established, since at least 1955, there were calls for the creation of a federal law reform commission. The federal law commission was preceded by the Ontario Law Reform Commission, which was created in 1964. In 1966, the Canadian Bar Association passed a resolution at its annual meeting calling for the creation of a federal law reform commission. On February 16, 1970, the then Liberal Minister of Justice John Turner introduced Bill C-186, which called for the establishment of a national law reform agency. The bill successfully passed, and the Law Reform Commission of Canada was created.

The LRCC was meant to provide expert advice on reformations of legislation. It was to study and review on an ongoing basis the laws of Canada, and to make recommendations for their improvement.

No legislation based on the LRCC's recommendations were enacted during the first ten years of the Commission's existence. The commission did not issue a final report until its fifth year. Finally, in 1983, legislation was enacted that implemented one of its reports.

In January 1974, Law Reform Commission of Canada published Working Paper 1: The Family Court. On the basis of the recommendations set out in the working paper, the Department of Justice in 1975 endorsed several pilot projects which ultimately led to the establishment of Unified Family Courts in most Canadian provinces. Many of the Law Reform Commission's recommendations on divorce, spousal and child support, and custody and access were implemented in the Divorce Act of 1986. In February 1992, the Conservative government announced that it was to close the LRCC, along with five other organisations, as a cost savings measure.

=== Law Commission of Canada ===
In 1996, Liberal Minister of Justice Allan Rock reintroduced Bill C-9 to create the Law Commission of Canada. On May 29, 1996, Bill C-9 received royal assent. The LCC commenced operations during 1997. Its mandate was different than under the former LRCC. The LCC was meant to be inclusive to Canadians, and to adopt a multidisciplinary approach. It was made up of five commissioners appointed by the Cabinet of Canada on the recommendations of the Minister of Justice. The president was a full-time commissioner, while the other four commissioners served on a part-time basis.

In 2002, it released a report recommending Parliament remove restrictions on same-sex marriage. In 2004, it released a report on electoral reform that suggested introducing mixed member proportional representation.

==== Hiatus ====
On September 26, 2006, the federal government announced it would be cutting funding for the LCC. It said that the cuts would save $4.19 million for the government over the next two years.

Resurrection

In 2023, the Law Commission was re-established with a focus on reforming legal institutions through research and reflection on the law in Canada.
