= Citation of Canadian legislation =

System for citing Canadian laws

Citation of Canadian legislation is the system of citing Canadian statutes and regulations in court decisions, briefs of law, and articles in law journals. The purpose of a citation is to allow the reader to understand the source of the legislative principle being cited, and to find the law in question. It is a type of legal citation, namely a "reference to a legal precedent or authority, such as a case, statute, or treatise, that either substantiates or contradicts a given position".

The Canadian citation system covers the primary laws enacted by the Parliament of Canada and the provincial and territorial legislatures. The citation system also applies to secondary legislation, such as regulations. The format for citations is generally similar across Canada, but there are some differences in particular cases.

Canadian statutes were originally published solely in book form, so statute citation methods have traditionally been based on the physical book in which the statutory provision can be found. With the expansion of internet publishing, statutes are now published mainly online, and in some jurisdictions, the online publication is official. However, the statute citation methods still tend to be based on the model of a physical book, in some cases with additional provisions to show the electronic source of a statute.

== Citation Guides ==
The primary guide to statute citation in Canada is the Canadian Guide to Uniform Legal Citation, commonly called the "McGill Guide". The Guide is produced by the McGill Law Journal of the McGill University Faculty of Law in Montreal in a fully bilingual format. It has been adopted by a number of Canadian law journals and courts as the standard guide.

However, the McGill Guide is not the only statute citation system. For example, the courts of Saskatchewan have adopted their own uniform guide to citation, to be used for all documents filed in the Saskatchewan courts. Although similar to the rules set out in the McGill Guide, it differs in points of detail. Law schools may also publish guides to citation, such as the online guide prepared by Queen's University Library, based on the McGill Guide. Other institutions, such as law journals, may have their own house style.

== Constitutional enactments ==
The Constitution of Canada is made up of over thirty different enactments, from various sources. There is no uniform way to cite them. The two enactments which are most frequently cited are the Constitution Act, 1867 and the Canadian Charter of Rights and Freedoms. They are generally cited as follows:

- Constitution Act, 1867 (UK), 30 & 31 Victoria, c. 3 (UK).
- Canadian Charter of Rights and Freedoms, Part I of the Constitution Act, 1982, being Schedule B of the Canada Act 1982 (UK), 1982, c. 11 (UK).

Another option is to cite to reproductions of the constitutional enactments in Appendix II of the Revised Statutes of Canada 1985. By this approach, the Constitution Act, 1867 is cited as:

- Constitution Act, 1867, RSC 1985, App. II, No. 5.

Given the length of this citation, the section number being cited should follow immediately the title of the enactment, rather than after the RSC reference. Another difficulty is that not all of the constitutional enactments are contained in Appendix II.

== Legislative practice ==
Parliament and most provincial legislatures in Canada use a mixture of revised statutes and annual statutes, so the citation will depend on the source of the statute. In these systems, the citation is either to the revised statutes, or to the annual volume. Amending statutes are cited to the annual volume where the statute was enacted.

There are two provinces which do not follow this system: Quebec and Manitoba. Instead, both of these provinces use an ongoing consolidation, composed of existing statutes. As new principal statutes are enacted, they are added to the ongoing revision, with citations to the ongoing consolidation. New statutes or amending statutes continue to be cited to the annual volume until incorporated into the ongoing consolidation.

== Statutes: basic elements ==
The basic elements for a statute citation will generally be similar across Canada, although there are some variations amongst jurisdictions. The statute citation system for each jurisdiction will reflect these differences in legislative practices.

Statute citations will normally contain the following elements:

- name of the statute;
- consolidation, statute revision, or annual volume;
- legislature which enacted the statute;
- year of the statute revision or year the statute was enacted (omitted for ongoing consolidations);
- chapter number in the volume where the statute is found;
- pinpoint references to the exact section or sections being cited.

=== Titles ===
All statutes have a long title, listed at the head of the statute. Most jurisdictions also give a short title for statutes, either as the first section of the statute, or as the header of the subsequent pages of the statute in the hard copies. For example, the long title of the Criminal Code is An Act respecting the Criminal Law. The short title is given in the first section: "This Act may be cited as the Criminal Code." In some cases, the year is included in the short title of a statute. In that case, it is separated from the words of the short title by a comma. Some jurisdictions, such as Saskatchewan, include "The" in the short title of their statutes.

The short title and the long title of a statute or regulation are italicised. The title is followed by a comma.

=== Volume and jurisdiction ===
The volume and jurisdiction together identify the source of the statute. When the volume is in a statute revision, the source is given as "Revised Statutes" coupled with the jurisdiction. For example, the revised statutes of Canada or New Brunswick will be cited as "Revised Statutes of Canada" or "Revised Statutes of New Brunswick". "Revised Statutes" is abbreviated as "RS" along with the abbreviation for the jurisdiction, so "Revised Statutes of Canada" is abbreviated as "RSC" and "Revised Statutes of New Brunswick" is abbreviated as "RSNB". The abbreviation is then followed by the year the revision was produced.

When the statute is found in one of the annual statute volumes rather than a statute revision, the reference is simply to the statutes of that jurisdiction. For example, an annual volume of the federal statutes is cited as "Statutes of Canada", abbreviated "SC". The same pattern is used for a citation to a provincial or territorial statute volume. A Prince Edward Island statute volume would be cited as "Statutes of Prince Edward Island", or "SPEI".

The two ongoing provincial revisions, Quebec and Manitoba, are cited to the continuing consolidations: "Continuing Consolidation of the Statutes of Manitoba" ("CCSM") and "Consolidation of Quebec Laws and Regulations" ("CQLR"). References to annual statutes of these two provinces are cited in the same way as other jurisdictions: "Statutes of Manitoba" ("SM") and "Statutes of Quebec" ("SQ"), followed by the year.

There is no comma after the abbreviation of volume and jurisdiction.

=== Year ===
When the statute is found in a statute revision, the date is the year of the statute revision, not the date when the statute was originally enacted. For example, the current Revised Statute of Canada were finalised in 1985, so the citation is "RSC 1985". The current Revised Statutes of Ontario were finalised in 1990, and are therefore cited as "RS0 1990".

No date is used for the continuing consolidations of Quebec and Manitoba.

For annual volumes, the date is the that of the volume. For example, the volume of annual statutes of Canada for 2020 is cited as "SC 2020", while the volume of annual statutes for the Northwest Territories in 2021 is cited as "SNWT 2021". Some of the older volumes would be based on a parliamentary session, rather than the year of enactment, so the date could span two or more calendar years. For example, Parliament was continuously in session from 1974 to 1976, so the annual statute for that period is actually cited as "SC 1974-75-76".

In the case of a long session, there can be more than one volume of statutes in the annual statutes. The SC 1974-75-76 is actually three volumes. When the legislature enacts a large number of acts, or lengthy acts, that can also mean that the annual statutes are spread over more than one volume. However, the citation is always to the specific chapter number of the statute in question, without any reference to the volume number in the annual statutes.

The former practice was to use the regnal year of the monarch as the date for the annual statute volumes. That practice is no longer followed for statutes enacted after Confederation in 1867.

There is a comma after the year.

=== Chapter number ===
Within the annual statutes, each statute is assigned a chapter number. "Chapter" is abbreviated as "c.", followed by the chapter number. As mentioned above, in multi-volume revised statutes or annual statutes, there is no need to refer to the volume number, as the chapter number is a precise reference.

The practice in older statute volumes was to use simple numeric chapter numbers, but the newer practice is to use alpha-numeric chapter numbers for principal acts, based on the title of the statute, which facilitates sorting by title. Alphanumeric chapter numbers are based on the initial letter of the first word in the title, followed by a hyphen, and then the number of that statute within that alphabetical location. For example, the Criminal Code is the 46th statute in the Revised Statutes of Canada under "C", so its chapter number is "C-46". Whilst most provinces follow the federal model, Ontario uses a decimal in place of a hyphen. Some jurisdictions, such as Nova Scotia, continue to use simple numeric chapter numbers in their revised statutes

Alphanumeric chapter numbers are used for principal acts. Acts amending principal acts are normally simply given a numeric chapter number in the annual statute volume.

There is a comma after the chapter number.

=== Section numbers ===
The general practice is to cite to the specific section of an act which is in issue, or to a range of specific sections. Although statutes may be sub-divided into parts or titles, the citation normally gives a pinpoint cite to the section number. Parts or titles can be cited when the purpose is to refer to an entire part of the statute.

"Section" is always abbreviated to "s." (for one section) or "ss." (for more than one section). The symbols "§" and "¶" are not used for statute citations.

== Examples of citations ==
Using these components, statutes are cited as follows:

Title,	Jurisdiction and Type of Statute Collection	Volume year,	Chapter Number,	Section Number.
Criminal Code,	RSC	1985,	c. C-46,	s. 2.
United Nations Declaration on the Rights of Indigenous Peoples Act,	SC	2021	c. 14,	s. 1.
Taxation Act,	CQLR	[none]	c. I-3,	s. 1.
Business Corporations Act,	RSO	1990,	c. B.16,	s. 3.
The Saskatchewan Human Rights Code, 2018,	SS	2018,	c. S-24.2,	s. 1.

=== Abbreviations ===
References to the parts of statutes are abbreviated as follows:

- "RS" for "Revised Statutes";
- "S" for "Statutes";
- "CQLR" for "Consolidation of Quebec Laws and Regulations";
- "CCSM" for "Continuing Consolidation of Statutes of Manitoba";
- "c." for "chapter";
- "s." for "section".

The jurisdictions are abbreviated as follows:

- "C" for Canada;
- "A" for Alberta;
- "BC" for British Columbia;
- "M" for Manitoba;
- "NB" for New Brunswick;
- "NL" for Newfoundland and Labrador;
- "NS" for Nova Scotia;
- "NWT" for Northwest Territories;
- "Nu" for Nunavut;
- "O" for Ontario;
- "PEI" for Prince Edward Island;
- "Q" for Quebec;
- "S" for Saskatchewan.

=== Periods ===
The McGill Guide recommends that no periods be used for abbreviations, such as "c" for "chapter" and "s" for "section". However, not all guides follow that approach. For example, the Saskatchewan Courts guide provides that periods can be used for abbreviations in some instances, but not others.

== Additional comments ==
=== Bilingual legislation ===
All federal statutes and the statutes of Ontario, Quebec, New Brunswick, Manitoba, Northwest Territories, Yukon and Nunavut are bilingual, French and English. Some Saskatchewan statutes are also bilingual.

The citation system is the same for English and French statutes, but the abbreviations used for citations in French are different than in English. The McGill Guide, which is itself fully bilingual, should be consulted for the French citation styles.

=== Bill numbers ===
When a draft law is introduced in Parliament or a legislative assembly, it is referred to as a "Bill", and is given a bill number. In the federal Parliament, bills introduced in the House of Commons are designated "C-", followed by the number, whilst bills introduced in the Senate are designated "S-", followed by the number. Bills introduced in the unicameral provincial legislative assemblies are simply given numbers.

The bill numbering system restarts on a regular basis. In the federal Parliament and some provincial legislative assemblies, the bill numbering restarts at the beginning of a new session. In some legislative assemblies, the bill numbering restarts with a new assembly after a general election, and runs until the dissolution of the assembly and the next general election. Since the numbering systems regularly restart from 1, bill numbers are not unique to a particular statute. They are therefore not permanent citations. As well, once enacted a bill is no longer a bill, but an Act of the legislature.

For these reasons, bill numbers are not used once a bill is enacted as a statute. The statute citation system is used instead, which gives the statute a permanent and unique citation in the annual statute volume where it is published.

== Regulations ==
Regulations follow similar patterns, but there is much greater variation between different jurisdictions. All jurisdictions have a system of consolidating regulations, but may also publish regulations separately, usually in the Gazette for that jurisdiction.

== Electronic sources ==
All jurisdictions now make their statutes available on-line, through their own government web-pages, and through CanLII. In some jurisdictions, the electronic source is equally official with the published statute books, but in other jurisdictions the statute books are the sole official source. However, even when citing to electronic sources, the same principles of citation apply, with the addition of links to the electronic source.

== See also ==
- Legal citation
- Case citation
- Case citation § Canada
- Citation of United Kingdom legislation
- Australian Guide to Legal Citation
- Template:Cite canlaw
