= Case citation =

System for uniquely identifying individual rulings of a court

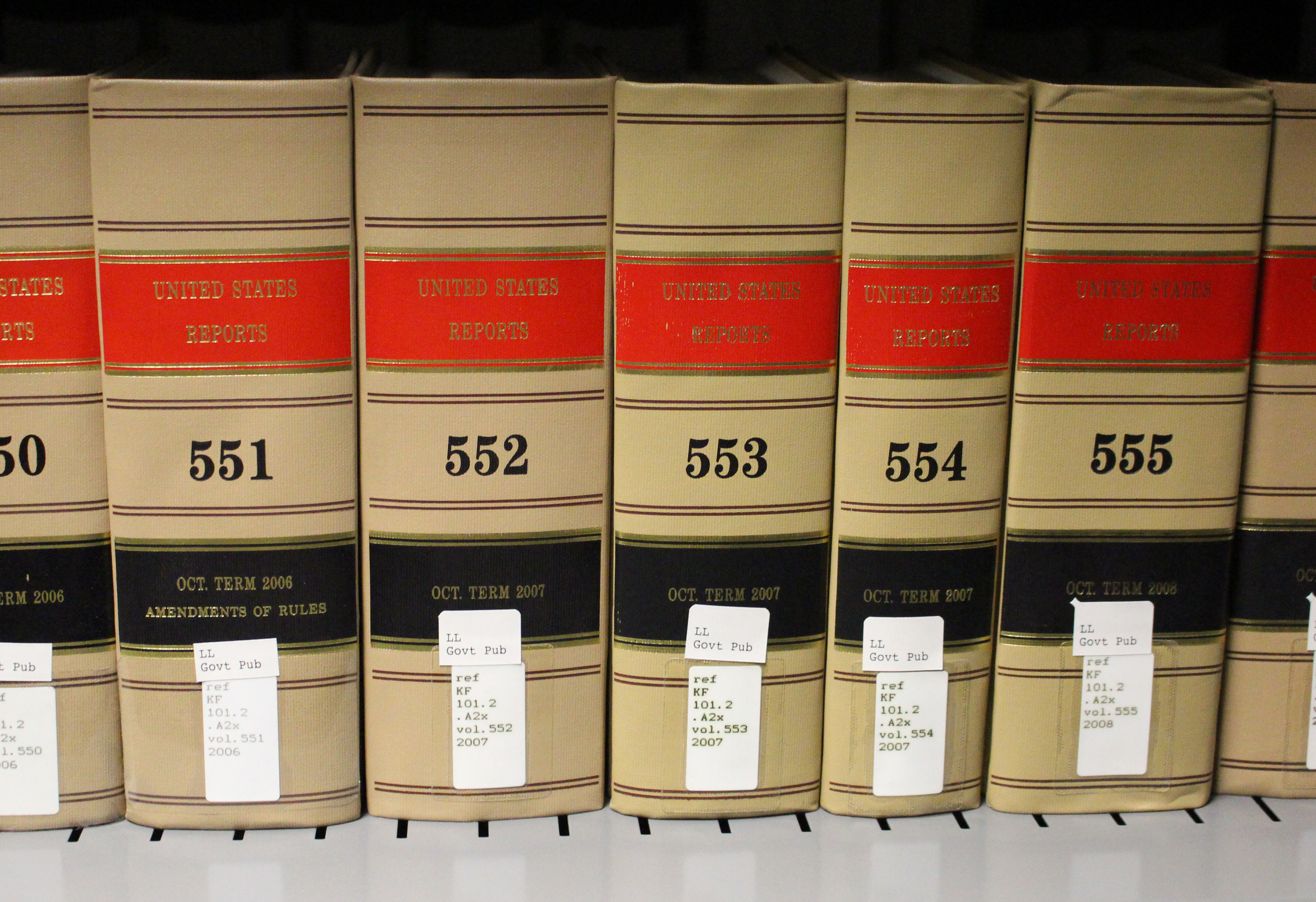
United States Reports, the official reporter of the Supreme Court of the United States

Case citation is a system used by legal professionals to identify past court case decisions, either in series of books called reporters or law reports, or in a neutral style that identifies a decision regardless of where it is reported. Case citations are formatted differently in different jurisdictions, but generally contain the same key information.

A legal citation is a "reference to a legal precedent or authority, such as a case, statute, or treatise, that either substantiates or contradicts a given position." Where cases are published on paper, the citation usually contains the following information:

- Court that issued the decision
- Report title
- Volume number
- Page, section, or paragraph number
- Publication year

In some report series, for example in England, Australia and some in Canada, volumes are not numbered independently of the year: thus the year and volume number (usually no greater than 4) are required to identify which book of the series has the case reported within its covers. In such citations, it is usual in these jurisdictions to apply square brackets "[year]" to the publication year (which may not be the year that the case was decided: for example, a case decided in December 2001 may have been reported in 2002).

The Internet brought with it the opportunity for courts to publish their decisions on websites and most published court decisions now appear in that way. They can be found through many national and other websites, such as WorldLII and AfricanLII, that are operated by members of the Free Access to Law Movement.

The resulting flood of non-paginated information has led to numbering of paragraphs and the adoption of neutral citation systems to identify decisions independently of medium or publisher. These usually contain the following information:

- Year of decision
- Abbreviated title of the court
- Decision number (not the court file number)

Rather than utilizing page numbers for pinpoint references, which would depend upon particular printers and browsers, pinpoint quotations refer to paragraph numbers.

== Pronunciation of case titles ==
In common law countries with an adversarial system of justice, the names of the opposing parties are separated in the case title by the abbreviation v (usually written as v in Commonwealth countries and usually as v. in the U.S.) of the Latin word versus, which means against. When case titles are read out loud, the v can be pronounced, depending on the context, as and, against, versus, or vee.

=== Commonwealth pronunciation ===
Most Commonwealth countries follow English legal style:

- Civil cases are pronounced with and. For example, Smith v Jones would be pronounced "Smith and Jones".
- Criminal cases are pronounced with against. For example, R v Smith would be pronounced "the Crown against Smith". The Latin words Rex, Regina, and versus are all rendered into English.
- In Australia and the United Kingdom, versus and vee are arguably incorrect.
- In Scotland, both civil and criminal cases are pronounced using "against" in the place of "v".

=== American pronunciation ===
In the United States, there is no consensus on the pronunciation of the abbreviation v. This has led to much confusion about the pronunciation and spelling of court cases:

- Versus is most commonly used, leading some newspapers to use the common abbreviation vs. in place of the legal abbreviation v.
- Against is a matter of personal style. For example, Warren E. Burger and John Paul Stevens preferred to announce cases at the Supreme Court with against.
- And is used by some law professors, but other law professors regard it as an affectation.
- Pronouncing the letter vee (/viː/) is used almost exclusively for Roe v. Wade, probably due to its widespread invocation in American culture. This pronunciation—which is discouraged within the legal profession—is otherwise rare among the general public, even when referring to other well-known cases like Brown v. Board of Education.

During oral arguments in Planned Parenthood v. Casey (1992), the participants demonstrated the lack of consensus on the pronunciation of "v.", using different pronunciations. Solicitor General Ken Starr even managed to use all three of the most common American pronunciations interchangeably:

This is the process of analysis that is quite familiar to the Court, very lengthily laid out by Justice Harlan in his dissent in Poe versus Ullman, and then adumbrated in his concurring opinion in Griswold against Connecticut. ... Well, I think that that is the necessary consequence of Roe vee Wade.

== Australia ==
Legal citation in Australia generally mirrors the methods of citation used in England. A widely used guide to Australian legal citation is the Australian Guide to Legal Citation, commonly known as AGLC, published jointly by the Melbourne University Law Review and the Melbourne Journal of International Law.

The standard case citation format in Australia is:

Style of cause	(year of decision)	[year of report]	volume	report	(series)	page
Mabo v Queensland (No 2)	(1992)		175	CLR		1.

As in Canada, there has been divergence among citation styles. There exist commercial citation guides published by Butterworths and other legal publishing companies, academic citation styles and court citation styles. Each court in Australia may cite the same case slightly differently. There is presently a movement in convergence to the comprehensive academic citation style of the Australian Guide to Legal Citation published jointly by the Melbourne University Law Review and the Melbourne Journal of International Law.

=== Reports ===
Abbreviation	Report	Years
AAR	Administrative Appeals Reports	–
ALJR	Australian Law Journal Reports	–
ALR	Australian Law Reports	1983 –
CLR	Commonwealth Law Reports	1903 –
FLC	Family Law Cases	–
FLR	Federal Law Reports	–
NSWLR	New South Wales Law Reports	–
Qd R	Queensland Reports	–
SASR	South Australian State Reports	–
VR	Victorian Reports	–
WAR	Western Australian Reports	1899–

=== Neutral citation ===
Australian courts and tribunals have now adopted a neutral citation standard for case law. The format provides a naming system that does not depend on the publication of the case in a law report. Most cases are now published on AustLII using neutral citations.

The standard format looks like this:

Year of decision	Court identifier	Ordinal number
[2005]	HCA	1

So the above-mentioned Mabo case would then be cited like this: Mabo v Queensland (No 2) [1992] HCA 23.

There is a unique court identifier code for most courts. The court and tribunal identifiers include:

Court Identifier	Court
HCA	High Court of Australia
FCA	Federal Court of Australia
FCAFC	Federal Court of Australia – Full Court (appeals bench)
FamCA	Family Court of Australia
FCCA	Federal Circuit Court of Australia (formerly Federal Magistrates Court of Australia)
FMCA	Federal Magistrates Court of Australia
FMCAfam	Federal Magistrates Court of Australia, family law decisions
AAT	Administrative Appeals Tribunal (federal)
NSWSC	Supreme Court of New South Wales
NSWCA	New South Wales Court of Appeal
NSWCCA	New South Wales Court of Criminal Appeal
NSWDC	District Court of New South Wales
WASC	Supreme Court of Western Australia
VSC	Supreme Court of Victoria
VCC	County Court of Victoria
VMC	Magistrates' Court of Victoria
ACTSC	Supreme Court of the Australian Capital Territory
ACTMC	Magistrates Court of the Australian Capital Territory

=== References ===
- Australian Guide to Legal Citation

== Canada ==
=== Citation standards in Canada ===
There are a number of citation standards in Canada. Many legal publishing companies and schools have their own standard for citation. Some courts have produced their own citation guides. For example, the courts in Saskatchewan have produced a bilingual citation guide that is to be used in all three Saskatchewan courts: Citation Guide for the Courts of Saskatchewan. Since the late 1990s, however, much of the legal community has converged to a single standard—formulated in The Canadian Guide to Uniform Legal Citation / Manuel canadien de la référence juridique, commonly known as the "McGill Guide" after the McGill Law Journal, which first published it.

More recently, in June 2024, CanLII announced a new, open access legal citation guide: the Canadian Open Access Legal Citation Guide ("COAL"), which is available at no charge on the CanLII system. The COAL follows a similar system for citing cases.

The following format reflects these standards:

Hunter v Southam, [1984] 2 SCR 145.

Broken into its component parts, the format is:

Style of cause	(year of decision),	[year of report]	volume	report	(series)	page	jurisdiction/court.
R v Big M Drug Mart Ltd,		[1985]	1	SCR		295.	
R v Oakes,		[1986]	1	SCR		103.	
Re Canada Trust Co and OHRC	(1990),		69	DLR	(4th)	321	(Ont CA).

The Style of Cause is italicized as in all other countries and the party names are separated by v (English; versus) or c (French; contre 'against'). Prior to 1984 the appellant party would always be named first. However, since then case names do not switch order when the case is appealed.

Undisclosed parties to a case are represented by initials (e.g., R v RDS). Criminal cases are prosecuted by the Crown, which is always represented by R for Regina (queen) or Rex (king). Reference questions (advisory opinions) are always entitled Reference re followed by the subject title.

If the year of decision is the same as the year of the report and the date is a part of the reporter's citation, then the date need not be listed after the style of cause. If the date of the decision is different from the year of the report, then both should be shown.

Where available, cases should be cited with their neutral citation immediately after the style of cause and preceding the print citation. For example,

Chaoulli v Quebec (Attorney General), 2005 SCC 35, [2005] 1 SCR 791.

This format was adopted as the standard in 2006, in the sixth edition of the McGill Guide. Prior to this format, the opposite order of parallel citation was used.

The seventh edition of the McGill Guide, published 2010-08-20, removes most full stop/period (".") characters from the citations, e.g., a citation to the Supreme Court Reports that previously would have been [2005] 1 S.C.R. 791, is now [2005] 1 SCR 791. Most full stops are also removed from styles of cause. The seventh edition also further highlights the significance of neutral citations (i.e., tribunal-assigned citations that are publisher-independent).

==== Reports ====
Abbreviation	Report	Years
Admin LR	Administrative Law Reports	1983–1991
Admin LR (2d)	Administrative Law Reports (second series)	1992–1998
Admin LR (3d)	Administrative Law Reports (third series)	1999–
ANWTYTR	Alberta, Northwest Territories & Yukon Tax Reporter	1973–
ACWS	All Canada Weekly Summaries	1970–1979
ACWS (2d)	All Canada Weekly Summaries (second series)	1980–1986
AR	Alberta Reports	1976–
CCLT (2d)	Canadian Cases on the Law of Torts	
DLR	Dominion Law Reports	
DLR (2d)	Dominion Law Reports (second series)	
DLR (3d)	Dominion Law Reports (third series)	–1984
DLR (4th)	Dominion Law Reports (fourth series)	1984–
FCR	Federal Court Reports	1971–
NBR (2d)	New Brunswick Reports	1969–
NR	National Reporter	
NSR (2d)	Nova Scotia Reports	1969–
OR (3d)	Ontario Reports	1986–
SCR	Supreme Court Reports	1970–
WWR	Western Weekly Reports	1911–1950, 1971–
WWR(NS)	Western Weekly Reports (New Series)	1950–1971

=== Neutral citation ===
In 1999 the Canadian Judicial Council adopted a neutral citation standard for case law. The format provides a naming system that does not depend on the publication of the case in a law report.

The standard format looks like this:

Year of decision	Court identifier	Ordinal number
2000	SCC	1

==== Court identifiers ====
There is a unique court identifier code for most courts.

Court Identifier	Court	from year
SCC	Supreme Court of Canada	2000
FCT	Federal Court of Canada	2001
FCA	Federal Court of Appeal	2001
TCC	Tax Court of Canada	2003
CMAC	Court Martial Appeal Court	2004
CM	Court Martial Court of Canada	2004
Comp Trib	Competition Tribunal of Canada	
BCCA	British Columbia Court of Appeal	1999
BCSC	Supreme Court of British Columbia	2000
BCPC	Provincial Court of British Columbia	
BCHRT	British Columbia Human Rights Tribunal	
BCSECCOM	British Columbia Securities Commission	
ABCA	Alberta Court of Appeal	2004
ABQB	Alberta Court of Queen's Bench	2004
ONCA	Ontario Court of Appeal	2007
ONSC	Ontario Superior Court of Justice	2010
QCCA	Quebec Court of Appeal	2005
QCCS	Quebec Superior Court	2006

== Denmark ==
Denmark has no official standard or style guide governing case citation. However, most case citations include the same elements.

=== Published decisions ===
Citations of decisions published in a reporter usually consist of the name or abbreviation of the reporter, the year or volume, the page number where the decision begin (sometimes followed by an identifying number if more than one judgment is on a page), as well as the name or abbreviation of the court which decided the case. As an example, the "Aalborg Kloster-judgment", a precedent-setting Supreme Court judgment regarding strict liability, is published in Ugeskrift for Retsvæsen volume 1968 as the second judgment on page 84. A citation of this case could take the form U.1968.84/2H, UfR 1968 84/2 H, Ugeskrift for Retsvæsen 1968, p. 84/2, or something similar. In this case U, UfR and Ugeskrift for Retsvæsen identify the reporter, 1968 identifies the year or volume, 84 identifies the starting page, /2 indicates that the judgment is the second one on that particular page, and H identifies the court which decided the case.

Certain reporters, such as Tidsskrift for Skatter og Afgifter, do not identify published decisions by page number, but by a serial number. Citations to these reporters use the serial number in place of a page number.

=== Unpublished decisions ===
If a decision has not been published in a reporter, more identifying information is needed. Generally, citations to unreported cases involve the name of the court, the date of the decision and the case number assigned by the court. For example: Sø- og Handelsrettens dom af 3. maj 2018 i sag nr. V-17-17 (The Maritime and Commercial Court's judgment of May 3 in case no. V-17-17). Certain authors format these citations to mimic the "short citation" of published cases.

=== Neutral citations and the ECLI ===
The Danish Court Administration is currently working on a public database which will make all judgments available to the public (currently only the Supreme Court as well as the Maritime and Commercial Court do this). The database is expected to implement the European Case Law Identifier, which will make uniform, neutral citations of decisions possible.

=== Reporters ===
Abbreviation(s)	Full name	Translated title	Topic area
U, UfR	Ugeskrift for Retsvæsen	Weekly Reporter of the Judiciary (translated varyingly as "the Danish Weekly Law Reports", "the Weekly Law Journal", and "the Weekly Law Review" by the European Court of Human Rights)	The most broad of the reporters. Publishes all decisions of the Supreme Court, principal decisions from the High Courts and, in special cases, decisions from municipal courts or other bodies, regardless of topic area.
FED	Forsikrings- og Erstatningsretlig Domssamling	Reporter of Insurance and Tort Law	Publishes decisions from the courts and the Insurance Complaints Board relevant to the areas of insurance and tort law.
FM	Fuldmægtigen	The Agent	Publishes decisions relevant to the areas of enforcement, probate, and bankruptcy law as well as registration of property and civil procedure.
KFE	Kendelser om Fast Ejendom	Orders regarding Real Estate	Publishes decisions from administrative and arbitration bodies relevant to the areas of real estate and land law.
MAD	Miljøretlige Afgørelser og Domme	Decisions and Judgments in Environmental Law	Publishes decisions from courts and administrative bodies, both national and international, relevant to the area of environmental law.
TBB, T:BB	Tidsskrift for Bolig- og Byggeret	Reporter of Housing and Construction Law	Publishes decisions from the courts as well as principal decisions from arbitration bodies relevant to the area of housing and construction.
TFA	Tidsskrift for Familie- og Arveret	Reporter of Family- and Inheritance Law	Publishes decisions from the courts and administrative bodies relevant to the area of family and inheritance law.
TfK	Tidsskrift for Kriminalret	Reporter of Criminal Law	Publishes decisions from the High Courts and the Special Court of Indictment and Revision relevant to the areas of criminal law and criminal procedure. Also publishes summaries of criminal law and criminal procedure cases published in Ugeskrift for Retsvæsen.
TfL	Tidsskrift for Landbrugsret	Reporter of Agricultural Law	Publishes decisions relevant to the area of agricultural law.
TfS	Tidsskrift for Skatter og Afgifter	Reporter of Taxes and Fees	Reports decisions and new legislation in the area of tax law.

=== References ===
- Andersen, Mads Bryde (2017). "Ugeskrift for Retsvæsen gennem 150 år". Ugeskrift for Retsvæsen B: 7.
- Biao v. Denmark, no. 38590/10, § 26
- Christensen v. Denmark, no. 247/07, § 59
- FT 2015-16, appendix A (L 22 as submitted), pp. 9–10
- Jersild v. Denmark, no. 15890/89, § 18
- Madsen, Lars Henrik Gam (2018). "Retsdogmatisk forskning 2018" (PDF). pp. 11–12.

== Germany ==
In Germany there are two types of citation: the full citation of a case and its shortened form. In e.g. scientific articles, the full citation of a particular case is only used at its first occurrence; after that, its shortened form is used. In most law journals, the articles themselves only use the shortened form; the full citations for all articles sometimes are summarized at the beginning of that journals edition.

A third type (yet not too widely spread) is the citation by using the European Case Law Identifier, a "neutral" citation system introduced by the Council of the European Union in 2011, which Germany is participating in.

=== Federal Constitutional Court ===
The most important cases of the Federal Constitutional Court are published by the court in its official collection. This collection is abbreviated BVerfGE, whereas BVerfG is short for Bundesverfassungsgericht, the German court name, and E stands for Entscheidung (decision).

Starting in 2004, the court also publishes the BVerfGK collection, containing decisions made only by a Kammer, a specific panel of the court.

The so-called Volkszählungsurteil for example could be cited

BVerfGE 65, 1 (43), Urteil des Ersten Senats vom 15. Dezember 1983 auf die mündliche Verhandlung vom 18. und 19. Oktober 1983, Az. 1 BvR 209, 269, 362, 420, 440, 484/83.

in full and

BVerfGE 65, 1 (43).

in short.

Official collection	Volume	Page of beginning	Page cited	More detailed information and date	Case number
BVerfGE	65,	1	(43),	Urteil des Ersten Senats vom 15. Dezember 1983 [in case of a hearing:] auf die mündliche Verhandlung vom 18. und 19. Oktober 1983,	Az. 1 BvR 209, 269, 362, 420, 440, 484/83

For the meaning of the different case numbers of the BVerfG see the German article.

If decisions are not yet published by the court, or will not be published at all, law journals can be cited, e.g.,

BVerfG, NJW 2009, 1234 (1235 f.).

Where NJW stands for the law journal Neue Juristische Wochenschrift, 2009 is the year, 1234 the page of the beginning and 1235 the cited page(s) – "f." stands for "seq.". In general, citations of the official collections are preferred.

=== Federal Court of Justice ===
The Federal Court of Justice (Bundesgerichtshof, short BGH) publishes the official collections BGHSt for its criminal law decisions and BGHZ for those in private law.

The Katzenkönigfall e.g. would be cited

BGHSt 35, 347 ff., Urteil des 4. Strafsenats vom 15. September 1988, Az. 4 StR 352/88.

in full and

BGHSt 35, 347 ff.

in short (in this example, the page cited is not specifically page 347 but that and those which follow, as indicated by the abbreviation "ff.").

=== Other federal courts ===
The official collection of the Federal Social Court (Bundessozialgericht, BSG) is abbreviated BSGE.

The official collection of the Federal Fiscal Court (Bundesfinanzhof, BFH) is BFHE.

The official collection of the Federal Labour Court (Bundesarbeitsgericht, BAG) is BAGE.

The official collection of the Federal Administrative Court (Bundesverwaltungsgericht, BVerwG) is BVerwGE.

=== Other courts ===
For other courts, generally the same rules apply, though most do not publish an official collection, so they must be cited from a law journal.

=== European Case Law Identifier ===
According to the ECLI system the Volkszählungsurteil would be cited as

ECLI:DE:BVerfG:1983:rs19831215.1bvr020983

and the Katzenkönigfall as

ECLI:DE:BGH:1988:150988U4STR352.88.0

== Hong Kong ==
In Hong Kong, cases are citied similarly to that of the United Kingdom's citation style. The most authoritative law report citation is cited following the parties' names, which is then followed by the neutral citation. The court the case is decided in is instead added to the end with parenthesis if the case does not have a neutral citation (i.e. decided before 2018).

Type	Style of cause	(Year of decision)	[Year of report]	Volume	Report	Page	Court	,	[Year of decision]	Court Identifier	Decision number
Reported case without neutral citation	Ng Ka Ling v Director of Immigration		[1999]	3	HKLRD	778	(HKCFA)				
Reported case with neutral citation	HKSAR v Lai Chee Ying	(2021)		24	HKCFAR	33		,	[2021]	HKCFA	3
Unreported case with neutral citation	Chung Sze Man v The University of Hong Kong								[2024]	HKCFI	2182

=== Law Reports ===
Abbreviation	Reporter	Years
HKLRD	The Authorised Hong Kong Law Reports & Digest	1997 –
HKCFAR	The Authorised Hong Kong Court of Final Appeal Reports	1997 –
HKC	Hong Kong Cases	1842 –
HKLR	Hong Kong Law Reports	1905 – 1996
HKCLR	Hong Kong Criminal Law Reports	1992 – 1996
HKDCLR	Hong Kong District Court Law Reports	1953 – 1996
HKLTLR	Hong Kong Lands Tribunal Law Reports	1977 – 1980
HKCLRT	Hong Kong Chinese Law Reports & Translations	1995 – 2008
CPR	Hong Kong Conveyancing and Property Reports	1980 –
HKFLR	Hong Kong Family Law Reports	2005 –
HKPLR	Hong Kong Public Law Reports	1991 –
HKLD	Hong Kong Law Digests	1985 – 1996
HKLDY	Hong Kong Law Digest Yearbook	1994 – 1996
HKLY	Hong Kong Law Yearbook	1985 – 1993

=== Neutral Citations ===
Neutral citations were introduced by the Judiciary in 2018. Neutral citations are citations that identify the case independent of law reports and are assigned by the judiciary.

==== Court identifiers ====
There is a unique court identifier code for all courts and judicial tribunals in Hong Kong.

Court Identifier	Court
HKCFA	Court of Final Appeal
HKCA	Court of Appeal
HKCFI	Court of First Instance
HKCT	Competition Tribunal
HKDC	District Court
HKFC	Family Court
HKMagC	Magistrates' Courts
HKCrC	Coroner's Court
HKLaT	Labour Tribunal
HKLdT	Lands Tribunal
HKOAT	Obscene Articles Tribunal
HKSCT	Small Claims Tribunal

== India ==
India's vast federated judicial system admits to a large number of reporters, each with their own style of citation. There are over 200 law reports in India – subject-wise and state (province)-wise, authorized and unauthorized. In 2023, Supreme Court of India adopted a neutral citation scheme for its judgements which is being adopted by several high courts across the country.

=== Supreme Court of India ===
The official reporter for Supreme Court decisions is the Supreme Court Reports. These reports however lag behind other journals in the speed of reporting. While decisions themselves are uploaded by the Supreme Court itself on www.courtnic.nic.in, the edited versions with headnotes in the official reporter take years to compile. However, some reporters have been authorised to publish the Court's decisions. The All India Reporter (AIR) is an old and respected reporter that, in addition to the Supreme Court, also reports decisions of the various State High Courts. Other popular reporters include Supreme Court Cases, which has become the most cited report in the Supreme Court, the Supreme Court Almanac, and Judgements Today.

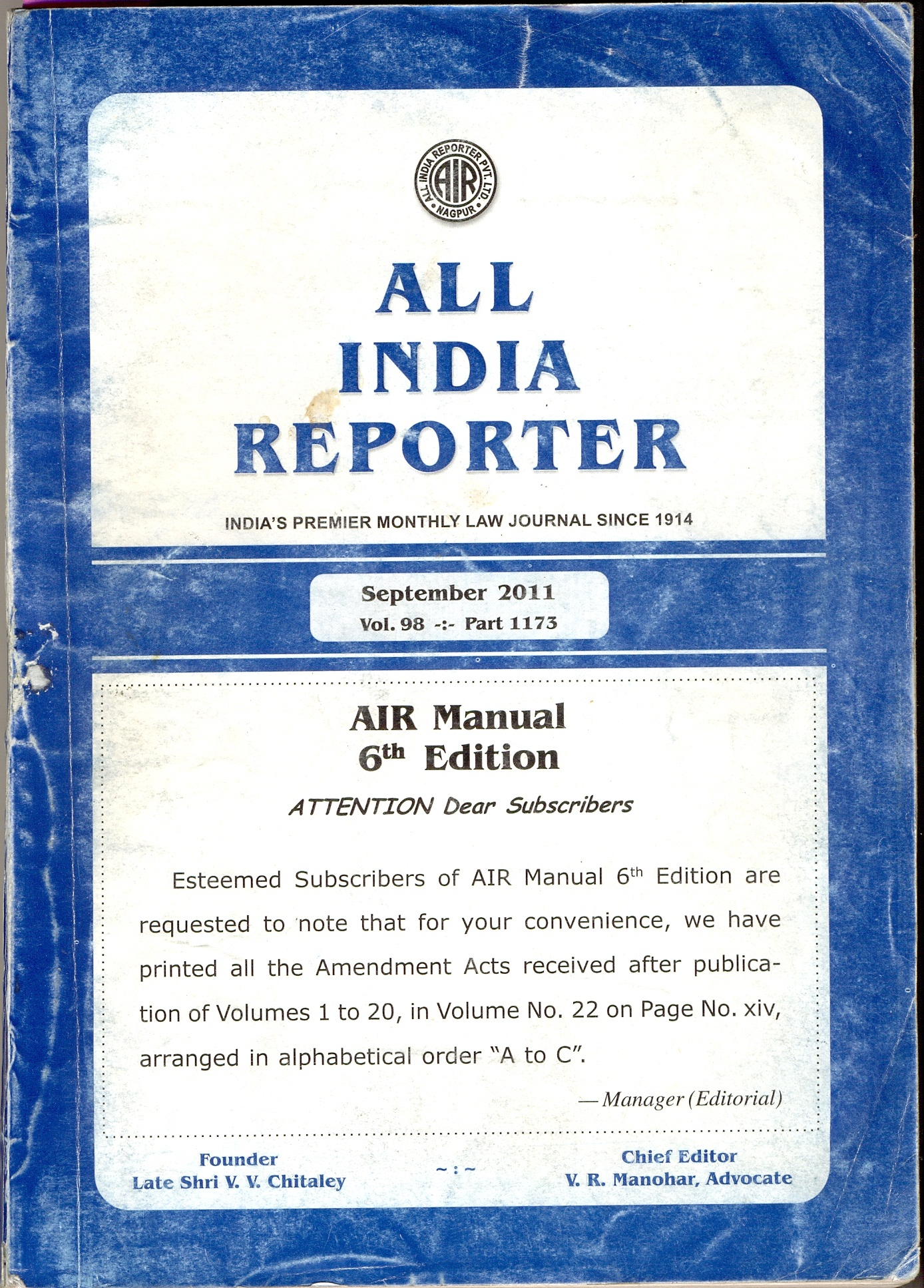
The All India Reporter

Sebastian Hongray v. Union of India:

- AIR 1984 SC 571 – "AIR" refers to the All India Reporter, "1984" is the year of judgement (AIR does not use a volume-based classification), "SC" refers to the Supreme Court of India, and "571" is the first page number of the report within the volume;
- (1984) 1 SCC 339 – "1984" is the year of publication, "1" is the volume number of the reporter, "SCC" stands for Supreme Court Cases (the name of the reporter), and "339" is the first page number of the report within the volume; and
- 1984 Cri LJ 289 (SC) – "1984" is the year of publication, "Cri LJ" is an abbreviation for the Criminal Law Journal (the name of the reporter), and "289" is the first page number of the report within the volume. The "SC" in parentheses indicates that the case was heard by the Supreme Court.

A citation of the "Supreme Court Almanac":

- Additional Secretary, Government of India v. Alka Subhash Gadia (1990) 2 Scale 1352

A citation in "Judgements Today":

- Premium Granites v. State of Tamil Nadu JT (1994) 1 SC 374

The "Supreme Court Cases (SCC)" published supplementary reports for a few years in the early 1990s. Those citations looked like this:

- Federation of Mining Associations v. State of Rajasthan 1992 Supp (2) SCC 239, which points to page 239 of the Second Supplementary Volume of the SCC reports in the year 1992. From 1996 the Supplementary Volumes were numbered in sequence after the regular volumes.

The SCC also have a separate series of subject-based reporting of the decisions of the Supreme Court:

- Rathinam Nagbhushan Patnaik v. Union of India 1994 SCC (Cri) 740, which refers to the SCC Criminal Reports
- Delhi Transport Corporation v. Mazdoor Congress 1991 SCC (L&S) 1213, which refers to the SCC Labour & Services Reports

=== Neutral Citation ===
A neutral citation system for Supreme Court judgments was implemented in 2023 to provide a uniform and permanent citation standard for its decisions, independent of any specific law reporter or commercial publisher. The initiative was announced by Chief Justice D. Y. Chandrachud to address the issue of multiple, inconsistent citations for the same judgment across different legal databases and publications. Each judgment is assigned a unique court-designated identifier, such as '2023 INSC 1', which consists of the year of the decision, the acronym 'INSC' for the Supreme Court of India, and a unique case number.

=== National Judicial Reference System (NJRS) ===
National Judicial Reference System (NJRS) is a project started by the Income-tax Department, Government of India. It has been envisaged as a tool to achieve efficiency in the tax litigation process of Income Tax Department (ITD). Within this project the Judicial Research & Reference System (JRRS) – JRRS is a repository of judicial orders as a single, indexed, searchable, cross-linked, database of Judgments / orders of ITAT, Authority of Advance Ruling (AAR), HC and SC.

The Citation nomenclature followed within NJRS :

- Chandra Ranganathan & Ors. v. Commissioner of Income-tax 2009-LL-1021, which refers to NJRS citations.

This Citation further allows to add the Authority where the judgment / order was pronounced.

- Chandra Ranganathan & Ors. v. Commissioner of Income-tax 2009-LL-1021-SC, which refers to NJRS citations.

== New Zealand ==
The standard case citation format in New Zealand is:

Style of cause	(year of decision)	[year of reporter]	volume	reporter	page
Taylor v New Zealand Poultry Board		[1984]	1	NZLR	394
R v Howse	(2005)		21	CRNZ	823

Several leading law reviews in New Zealand have also adopted the Australian Guide to Legal Citation (AGLC) such as the Canterbury Law Review. The AGLC style is also rather similar to citation style in New Zealand.

=== Reporters ===
Abbreviation	Reporter	Years
NZLR	New Zealand Law Reports	1881 –
CRNZ	Criminal Reports of New Zealand	1983 –
NZBORR	New Zealand Bill of Rights Reports	
NZAR	New Zealand Administrative Reports	1976–
NZFLR	New Zealand Family Law Reports	1981–
DCR	District Court Reports	1981–

Additionally, a number of other report series exist for specialist areas such as Family, Employment and Tax Law.

=== Neutral citation ===
New Zealand courts and tribunals have begun to adopt a neutral citation standard for case law. The format provides a naming system that does not depend on the publication of the case in a law report.

The standard format looks like this:

Year of decision	Court identifier	Ordinal number
[2005]	NZSC	1

There is a unique court identifier for each court or tribunal. These identifiers are:

Court Identifier	Court	Years
NZSC	Supreme Court of New Zealand	2005–
NZCA	New Zealand Court of Appeal	2007–
NZHC	High Court of New Zealand	2012–
NZDC	District Court of New Zealand	
NZEmpC	Employment Court of New Zealand	2010–
NZEnvC	Environment Court of New Zealand	2010–
NZFC	Family Court of New Zealand	2012–

Where both a neutral citation and a reporter citation exist, the neutral citation should come first e.g. R v AM [2010] NZCA 114, [2010] 2 NZLR 750

== Norway ==
The Norwegian standard case citation format for published court decisions is:

Rt. 1952 s. 989 (Telefonsjikanedommen)

where:

- Rt. identifies the report series.
  - All supreme court judgments are published in Retstidende (Court Times), abbreviated Rt.
  - Many judgments and decisions from lower courts are published in Rettens gang (RG).
- 1952 is the year of reporter
- s. is the Norwegian abbreviation for page. This is optional.
- 989 is the first page number of the decision in the reporter.
- Finally, one can add the popular name of the decision. It is unusual to refer to name of the plaintiff(s) and defendant(s), but often there is an unofficial name. Telefonsjikanedommen refers to a 1952 case where the Supreme Court ruled that telephone harassment ("telefonsjikane") was not illegal under the current criminal code.

== Philippines ==
Despite the long-standing civil law tradition in the Philippines, reliance on judicial precedents has become indispensable since the period of American rule. Supreme Court decisions are expressly recognized as part of the internal law, and are thus frequently cited in court decisions and legal pleadings. Though there is only one Supreme Court in the Philippines, the citation of its decisions varies, depending on which reporter of a case is relied on by the person citing that case.

=== Supreme Court ===
==== Philippine Reports ====
The Philippine Reports is the official reporter of decisions of the Supreme Court of the Philippines. The standard format for citation of the Philippine Reports is:

Disini v. Secretary of Justice, 727 Phil. 28 (2014)

where:

- Disini v. Secretary of Justice is the name of the case
- 727 is the volume number of the Philippine Reports where the case may be found
- Phil. is the standard abbreviation of Philippine Reports
- 28 is the page number in the Philippine Reports that contains the beginning of the decision. If this number is followed by a comma then another page number (i.e., 727 Phil. 28, 30), the latter number indicates the particular page where the annotated text can be found
- (2014) is the year the case was decided.

As of present, Philippine cases are contained in quarterly issues.

==== Supreme Court Reports Annotated ====
In the last few decades, the Philippine Reports has suffered from production problems, resulting in long delays in publication, as well as significant gaps within its published series. As a result, the privately published Supreme Court Reports Annotated (published by Central Professional Books, Inc.) has become more widely used than the Philippine Reports, even by the courts. The proper format for citation of the Supreme Court Reports Annotated is:

Neri v. Senate, G.R. No. 180643, 25 March 2008, 549 SCRA 77

where:

- Neri v. Senate is the name of the case
- G.R. No. 180643 is the case docket number originally assigned by the Supreme Court at the time the action was filed with the Court (G.R. stands for General Register)
- 25 March 2008 is the exact date the decision of this case was promulgated
- 549 is the volume number of the Supreme Court Reports Annotated where the case may be found
- SCRA is the standard abbreviation of Supreme Court Reports Annotated
- 77 is the page number in the Supreme Court Reports Annotated that contains the beginning of the decision. If this number is followed by a comma then another page number (i.e., 549 SCRA 77, 79), the latter number indicates the particular page where the annotated text can be found

When citing cases not yet reported in the SCRA or Philippine Reports, the above citation without reference to the SCRA is preferred (i.e., Neri v. Senate, G.R. No. 180643, 25 March 2008).

=== Lower court decisions ===
As there are no official or unofficial reporters that regularly publish decisions of the Court of Appeals and other lower courts, citation of their decisions hews to the same format as cases not reported either in the Philippine Reports or the SCRA. Thus: (case name), (docket number), (date of promulgation of decision). For the Court of Appeals, docket numbers begin as CA-G.R. No., followed by either CR for criminal, CV for civil, and SP for the "Special Cases Section".

== South Africa ==
Abbreviation	Reporter	Years
AD	South African Law Reports, Appellate Division	1910 – 1946
All SA	All South African Law Reports	1996 –
BCLR	Butterworths Constitutional Law Reports	1994 –
BLLR	Butterworths Labour Law Reports	1994 –
ILJ	Industrial Law Journal (Note: Industrial Law Journal including the Industrial Law Reports. Juta & Co. Cape Town, South Africa. This journal is not the Industrial Law Journal published in the United Kingdom.)	1980 –
JOL	Judgments Online	1997 –
PH	Prentice Hall Weekly Legal Service	1923 – 1995
SA (Note: Sometimes abbreviated "SALR", which is also used for the South Australian Law Reports.)	South African Law Reports	1947 –
SACR	South African Criminal Law Reports	1990 –
SALLR	South African Labour Law Reports	1991 –

=== Cape ===
Abbreviation	Reporter	Years
CPD	South African Law Reports, Cape Provincial Division	1910 – 1946
CTR	Cape Times Law Reports	1891 – 1910
SC	Supreme Court Reports	1880 – 1910

==== Eastern Districts ====
Abbreviation	Reporter	Years
EDC	Eastern Districts Court Reports	1880 – 1909
EDL	South African Law Reports, Eastern Districts Local Division	1910 – 1946

==== Griqualand ====
Abbreviation	Reporter	Years
HCG	High Court of Griqualand Reports	1882 – 1910
GWL	South African Law Reports, Griqualand West Local Division (Note: Reports of Cases Decided in the Supreme Court of South Africa, Griqualand West Local Division)	1910 – 1946

=== Natal ===
Abbreviation	Reporter	Years
NLR	Natal Law Reports (New Series)	1879 – 1932
NPD	South African Law Reports, Natal Provincial Division	1933 – 1946

=== Orange ===
Abbreviation	Reporter	Years
ORC	Orange River Colony Law Reports	1903 – 1910
OPD	South African Law Reports, Orange Free State Provincial Division	1910 – 1946

=== Transvaal ===
Abbreviation	Reporter	Years
TS (Note: Cited "TP" for 1910)	Transvaal Law Reports, Supreme Court	1902 – 1910
TH (Note: Cited "TL" for 1910)	Transvaal Law Reports, High Court	1902 – 1910
TPD	South African Law Reports, Transvaal Provincial Division	1910 – 1946
WLD	South African Law Reports, Witwatersrand Local Division	1910 – 1946

== Switzerland ==
Citations vary by court and by language. Cases of the Swiss Federal Supreme Court are cited as follows:

Officially published cases are cited as BGE 133 II 292 [E. 3.2 S. 296] (German: Bundesgerichtsentscheide) or ATF 133 II 292 [consid. 3.2 p. 296] (French: arrêts du tribunal fédéral). In this example, 133 is the annual issue of the court reports, II the part indicating the division of the Court, and 292 the page on which the decision begins. Optionally, "E. 3.2" and "S. 296" are the section and page specifically cited.

Supreme Court decisions not selected for official publication are cited as Urteil [des Bundesgerichts] 5C.260/2006 vom 30. März 2007 or arrêt [du Tribunal fédéral] 5C.260/2006 du 30 mars 2007 respectively. In this example, 5C is the division of the Court, 260 the case number and 2006 the year in which the case was opened.

The citation style for cases of the inferior federal courts of Switzerland is similar.

== United Kingdom ==
=== Neutral citation ===
Since 2001, judgments in the House of Lords, Privy Council, Court of Appeal and Administrative Court have been issued with neutral citations. This system was extended to other parts of the High Court in 2002. Judgments with neutral citations are freely available on the British and Irish Legal Information Institute website (www.bailii.org).

Neutral citations identify judgments independently of any series of reports, and cite only parties, year of judgment, court and case number. For example, Rottman v MPC [2002] UKHL 20 identifies the 20th judgment in 2002 in the UK House of Lords. UKHL stands for UK House of Lords. EWHC and EWCA identify the England and Wales High Court and Court of Appeal respectively. These abbreviations are generally followed by an abbreviation indicating the court or division (e.g. Admin, Ch, Crim, Pat).

=== How to cite a case ===
If a neutral citation is available for a judgment, it should immediately follow the party names. If the judgment has also been reported in a law reports series, follow the neutral citation with the best report, which is usually from the official Law Reports series (Appeals Cases – AC, Chancery – Ch, Family – Fam, Queen's Bench – QB etc.).

The case of Rottman v MPC was reported in the Appeals Cases, so the citation should be:

- Rottman v MPC [2002] UKHL 20, [2002] 2 AC 692.

This means that a report of the case and the judgment can be found in the 2002 volumes, vol 2, of the Law Reports series called Appeals Cases, beginning at page 692.

To cite a particular paragraph from the judgment, add the paragraph number in square brackets at the end of the citation:

- Rottman v MPC [2002] UKHL 20, [2002] 2 AC 692 [58].

If a case is not reported in the Law Reports, the next best report is the Weekly Law Reports (e.g. [2002] 2 WLR 1315), and then the All England Reports (e.g., [2002] 2 All ER 865). In some situations, it might be preferable to cite a specialist series, e.g., Rottman v MPC was also cited in the Human Rights Law Reports, at [2002] HRLR 32.

For cases before 2001, cite the best report. If referring to a particular page of the judgment, give that page number after the page number on which the report begins. The following citation refers to page 573 of the Donoghue v Stevenson judgment:

- Donoghue v Stevenson [1932] AC 562, 573.
- See Oxford Standard for the Citation of Legal Authorities

=== England and Wales ===
The standard case citation format in England and Wales is:

Style of cause	(year of decision),	[year of report]	volume	report	(series)	page	jurisdiction/court
Donoghue v Stevenson		[1932]		AC		562	(HL).
R v Dudley and Stephens	(1884)		14	QBD		273.	

In England and Wales as with certain Commonwealth countries, the abbreviation "R" for rex (king) or regina (queen), pronounced "Crown", is used for cases in which the state is a party. This includes most criminal cases (usually brought on behalf of the Crown by the Crown Prosecution Service in England and Wales, the Public Prosecution Service for Northern Ireland, or a procurator fiscal in Scotland, private prosecutions being a minority) and judicial review cases, in which the Crown is formally the complainant (with the applicant listed as such) and a Crown officer or public body is respondent. The Crown is immune from prosecution, and from being sued except under the terms of a petition of right or the Crown Proceedings Act 1947, and so rarely appears as respondent and never as defendant; where "R" appears in that place, as in R v R, it is usually an anonymized party and thus pronounced "R". When the attorney general or the director of public prosecutions is a party not representing the Crown (most commonly as respondent in a judicial review case), the abbreviation "AG" or "DPP" may be used.

Square brackets "[ ]" are used when the year is essential to locating the report (e.g., the official law reports either—as with Donoghue v Stevenson, above—do not have volume numbers or, if there are multiple volumes in a single year, they are numbered 1, 2, etc.). Round brackets "( )" are used when the year is not essential but is useful for information purposes, e.g., in reports that have a cumulative volume number such as R v Dudley and Stephens, above.

=== Law reports ===
The term "reporter", meaning a law report or a series of them, is not widely used in England and Wales. Before 1865, English courts used a large number of privately printed reports, and cases were cited based on which report they appeared in. (This system was also used in the United States and other common law jurisdictions during that period.)

Two main unofficial law reports report all areas of law: the Weekly Law Reports (WLR) and the All England Reports (All ER). In addition, a number of unofficial specialist law reports focus on particular areas, e.g., Entertainment and Media Law Reports (EMLR) or the Criminal Appeal Reports (Cr App R).

For the citation of "The Law Reports" of the Incorporated Council of Law Reporting, see Law Reports. These have been published since 1865. They have always been split into a number of different series, the current series being the Appeal Cases (AC), Chancery (Ch), Family (Fam), and Queen's Bench (QB) (or King's Bench—KB—depending on the monarch of the time). These four series are cited in preference to all others in court.

The table below is an incomplete list of law reports other than "The Law Reports", nominate reports and reprints.

Abbreviation	Law report	Years
All ER	The All England Law Reports	from 1936
BCLC	Butterworths Company Law Cases	from 1983
BHRC	Butterworths Human Rights Cases	from 1996
BMLR	Butterworths Medico-Legal Reports	unknown
Con LR	Construction Law Reports	from 1985
Cox CC (Note: Archbold abbreviates it to "Cox", which is also used for Cox's Chancery Cases.)	Cox's Criminal Cases	1843–1941
Cr App R	Criminal Appeal Reports	from 1908
Cr App R (S)	Criminal Appeal Reports (Sentencing)	from 1979
Crim LR	The Criminal Law Review (Note: Carries summary reports that can be used if, and only if, a verbatim report is not available.)	
ECHR	European Court of Human Rights Cases	from 1960
EGLR	Estates Gazette Law Reports	from 1975
FCR	Family Court Reports	from 1987
FLR	Family Law Reports	from 1864
GCCR	Goode Consumer Credit Reports	from 1882
The Independent	The Independent (Note: Carries summary reports that can be used if, and only if, a verbatim report is not available.)	
IRLR	Industrial Relations Law Reports	from 1972
IP & T	Butterworths Intellectual Property and Technology Cases	from 1999
JP	Justice of the Peace Law Reports	from 2003
ITLR	International Tax Law Reports	from 1998
Lloyd's Rep	Lloyd's Law Reports	from 1919
LGR	Butterworths Local Government Reports	from 1997
LRC	Law Reports of the Commonwealth	from 1985
LT	The Law Times Reports	1859–1947
LT (OS)	The Law Times Reports, Old Series	1843–1859
OPLR	Occupational Pensions Law Reports	from 1992
PLR	Estates Gazette Planning Law Reports	from 1988
RPC	Reports of Patent Cases	from 1939
SJ (Note: Also abbreviated "Sol Jo".)	The Solicitors' Journal	from 1856
STC	Simon's Tax Cases	from 1973
TC	Official Tax Case Reports	from 1883
The Times	The Times (Note: Carries summary reports that can be used if, and only if, a verbatim report is not available.)	
TLR	The Times Law Reports	1885–1952
WLR	The Weekly Law Reports	from 1953
WN	Weekly Notes	1866–1952

The table below is a list of series that are reprints of earlier reports.

Abbreviation	Law report	Years
ER	The English Reports	1220–1866
RR	The Revised Reports	
All ER Rep	The All England Law Reports Reprint	

For nominate reports, see Nominate reports.

=== Scotland ===
The standard case citation formats in Scotland are:

Name of parties	Year of decision,	Year of report	Volume	Series	Court	Page
HM Advocate v Megrahi,		2000		JC		555
McFarlane v Tayside Health Board,		2000		SC	(HL)	1
Forbes v Underwood,	(1886)		13	R (or 'Rettie')		465
Smith v Brown,	[2005]			CSIH		1

The Supreme Court has issued a practice note on the use of neutral citation. The Scots Law Times is cited as "SLT".

== United States ==
The standard case citation format in the United States is:

Roe v. Wade, 410 U.S. 113 (1973)

where:

- Roe v. Wade is the abbreviated name of the case. Generally, the first name (here, Roe) is the surname of the plaintiff, who is the party who filed the suit for an original case, or the appellant, the party appealing in a case being appealed from a lower court, or the petitioner when litigating in the high court of a jurisdiction; and the second name (here, Wade) is the surname of the defendant, the party responding to the suit, or the appellee, the party responding to the appeal, or the respondent, when defending in the high court of the jurisdiction. Litigants are generally referred to by their last name (when they are natural persons), and a case is generally referred to by the first named litigant on each side of the case. In this example, Roe refers to "Jane Roe", a pseudonym commonly used when it is appropriate to keep the identity of a litigant out of the public spotlight, and Wade refers to Henry Wade, the Dallas County District Attorney at the time.
- 410 is the volume number of the "reporter" that reported the Court's written opinion in the case titled Roe v. Wade.
- U.S. is the abbreviation of the reporter, or printed book of court opinions. Here, "U.S." stands for United States Reports.
- 113 is the page number (in volume 410 of United States Reports) where the opinion begins.
- 1973 is the year when the court rendered its decision.
- The abbreviated name of the court is included inside the parenthesis before the year if the name of the court is not obvious from the reporter. This rule comes into play because certain reporters, such as members of the West National Reporter System, publish opinions originating from multiple courts. In this example, the name of the court (United States Supreme Court) is obvious (since only decisions of the U.S. Supreme Court are published in United States Reports) and is thus omitted as a matter of convention.

Case citations are used to find a particular case, both when looking up a case in a printed reporter and when accessing it via the Internet or services such as LexisNexis or Westlaw.

This format also allows different cases with the same parties to be easily differentiated. For example, looking for the U.S. Supreme Court case of Miller v. California would yield four cases, some involving different people named Miller, and each involving different issues.

=== Supreme Court of the United States ===
Cases from the Supreme Court of the United States are officially printed in the United States Reports. A citation to the United States Reports looks like this:

- Brown v. Board of Education, 347 U.S. 483 (1954).
- Miranda v. Arizona, 384 U.S. 436 (1966).

Many court decisions are published in more than one reporter. A citation to two or more reporters for a given court decision is called a "parallel citation". For U.S. Supreme Court decisions, there are several unofficial reporters, including the Supreme Court Reporter (abbreviated S. Ct.) and United States Supreme Court Reports, Lawyers' Edition (commonly known simply as Lawyers' Edition) (abbreviated L. Ed.), which are printed by private companies and provide further annotations to the opinions of the Court. Although a citation to the latter two is not required, some attorneys and legal writers prefer to cite all three case reporters at once:

- Griswold v. Connecticut, 381 U.S. 479, 85 S. Ct. 1678, 14 L. Ed. 2d 510 (1965)

The "2d" after the L. Ed. signifies the second series of the Lawyers' Edition. United States case reporters are sequentially numbered, but the volume number is never higher than 999. When the 1,000th volume is reached (the threshold in earlier years was lower), the volume number is reset to 1 and a "2d" is appended after the reporter's abbreviation. Some case reporters are in their third series, and a few are approaching their fourth.

Some very old Supreme Court cases have odd-looking citations, such as Marbury v. Madison, 5 U.S. (1 Cranch) 137 (1803). The "(1 Cranch)" refers to the fact that, before there was a reporter series known as the United States Reports compiled by the Supreme Court's Reporter of Decisions, cases were gathered, bound together, and sold privately by the Court's Reporter of Decisions. In this example, Marbury was first reported in an edition by William Cranch, who was responsible for publishing Supreme Court reports from 1801 to 1815. Such reports, named for the individual who gathered them and hence called "nominative reports", existed from 1790 to 1874. Beginning in 1874, the U.S. government created the United States Reports, and at the same time simultaneously numbered the volumes previously published privately as part of a single series and began numbering sequentially from that point. In this way, "5 U.S. (1 Cranch)" means that it is the 5th overall volume of the United States Reports series, but the first that was originally published by William Cranch; four volumes of opinions prior to that were (for example) published by Alexander Dallas (for example, "4 U.S. (4 Dall.)"), and after Cranch's 9 volumes, 12 more were published by Henry Wheaton (e.g., "15 U.S. (2 Wheat.)"). See the Supreme Court of the United States Reporter of Decisions for other edition names. The name of the reporter of decisions has not been used in citations since the U.S. government began printing the United States Reports.

When a case has been decided, but not yet published in the case reporter, the citation may note the volume but leave blank the page of the case reporter until it is determined. For example, Golan v. Holder, 565 U.S. 302 (2012) was properly cited as Golan v. Holder, 565 U.S. ___ (2012) before publication.

In the caption of a Supreme Court case, the first name listed is the name of the petitioning (appealing) party, followed by the party responding (respondent) to the appeal. In most cases, the appealing party was the losing party in the prior court. This is no longer the practice used in cases in the federal courts of appeal, in which the original alignment of parties from the lower court is preserved.

=== Lower federal courts ===
Map of the geographic boundaries of the various United States Courts of Appeals and United States District Courts

United States court of appeals cases are published in the Federal Reporter (F., F.2d, F.3d, or F.4th). United States district court cases and cases from some specialized courts are published in the Federal Supplement (F. Supp., F. Supp. 2d, or F. Supp. 3d). Both series are published by Thomson West; they are technically unofficial reporters, but have become widely accepted as the de facto "official" reporters of the lower federal courts because of the absence of a true official reporter. (Of the federal appeals and district courts, only one, the D.C. Circuit, has an official reporter, United States Court of Appeals Reports, and even that one is rarely used today.)

When lower federal court opinions are cited, the citation includes the name of the court. This is placed in the parentheses immediately before the year. Some examples:

- Geary v. Visitation of Blessed Virgin Mary School, 7 F.3d 324 (3d Cir. 1993) – a 1993 case in the U.S. Court of Appeals for the Third Circuit
- Glassroth v. Moore, 229 F. Supp. 2d 1290 (M.D. Ala. 2002) – a 2002 case in the U.S. District Court for the Middle District of Alabama

U.S. circuit and district court cases from 1789 to 1880 were reported in Federal Cases, abbreviated F. Cas. An example of the citation form is: Wheaton v. Peters, 29 F. Cas. 862 (C.C.E.D. Pa. 1832) (No. 17,486).

=== State courts ===
State court decisions are published in several places. Many states have their own official state reporters, which publish decisions of one or more of that state's courts. Reporters that publish decisions of a state's highest court are abbreviated using the traditional abbreviation for the state's name (i.e., not the postal abbreviation), regardless of what the actual title of the reporter is. Thus, the official reporter of decisions of the California Supreme Court (titled California Reports) is abbreviated "Cal." (or, for subsequent series, "Cal. 2d," "Cal. 3d", or "Cal. 4th").

- Palsgraf v. Long Island Railroad Co., 248 N.Y. 339 (1928), a case in the New York Court of Appeals, reported in New York Reports. Note that the New York Court of Appeals is the highest court in New York. Because the New York Reports only report opinions of the New York Court of Appeals, there is no need to repeat the court designation before the year.
- Green v. Chicago Tribune Company, 286 Ill. App. 3d 1 (1996) – a case in the Illinois Appellate Court, reported in Illinois Appellate Court Reports. Note that, in contrast to New York, the Illinois Appellate Court is only the intermediate court of appeals in Illinois; decisions of the Illinois Supreme Court are reported in Illinois Reports, abbreviated "Ill." (or "Ill. 2d"). Because the Illinois Appellate Court Reports are dedicated solely to reporting decisions of the Illinois Appellate Court, there is no need to repeat the court designation before the year.
- Harte v. Hand, 438 N.J. Super. 545 (Ch. Div. 2014). Note that although all published opinions of the New Jersey Superior Court are published in the New Jersey Superior Court Reports, the organization of the Superior Court into three divisions (the Law Division, the Chancery Division, and the Appellate Division) means the citation must specify which division issued the opinion. This is especially salient as the Appellate Division hears appeals from the Law and Chancery Divisions, as occurred with the example case (a rehearing on remand of Harte v. Hand, 433 N.J. Super. 457 (App. Div. 2013)).

The Thomson West National Reporter System regions.

In addition to the official reporters, Thomson West publishes several series of "regional reporters" that cover several states each. These are the North Eastern Reporter, Atlantic Reporter, South Eastern Reporter, Southern Reporter, South Western Reporter, North Western Reporter, and Pacific Reporter. California, Illinois, and New York also each have their own line of Thomson West reporters, because of the large volume of cases generated in those states (titled, respectively, West's California Reporter, Illinois Decisions, and West's New York Supplement). Some smaller states (like South Dakota) have stopped publishing their own official reporters, and instead have certified the appropriate West regional reporter as their "official" reporter.

Here are some examples of how to cite West reporters:

- Jackson v. Commonwealth, 583 S.E.2d 780 (Va. Ct. App. 2003) – a case in the Virginia Court of Appeals (an intermediate appellate court) published in the South Eastern Reporter's 2nd series
- Foxworth v. Maddox, 137 So. 161 (Fla. 1931) – a case in the Florida Supreme Court published in the Southern Reporter
- People v. Brown, 282 N.Y.S.2d 497 (N.Y. 1967) – a case in the New York Court of Appeals (New York's highest court) published in West's New York Supplement's 2nd series. The case also appears in West's regional reporter: People v. Brown, 229 N.E.2d 192 (N.Y. 1967). Note, in both forms, that "N.Y." is placed in the parenthetical, because both West's New York Supplement and the North Eastern Reporter report the opinions of more courts than only the New York Court of Appeals. A citation to the officially published reports, People v. Brown, 20 N.Y.2d 238 (1967), however, does not require the court name in the parenthetical, because the official New York Reports only report opinions of the New York Court of Appeals.

Abbreviations for lower courts vary by state, as each state has its own system of trial courts and intermediate appellate courts. When a case appears in both an official reporter and a regional reporter, either citation can be used. Generally, citing to the regional reporter is preferred, since out-of-state attorneys are more likely to have access to these. Many lawyers prefer to include both citations. Some state courts require that parallel citations (in this case, citing to both the official reporter and an unofficial regional reporter) be used when citing cases from any court in that state's system.

Like the United States Supreme Court, some very old state case citations include an abbreviation of the name of either the private publisher or the reporter of decisions, a state-appointed officer who originally collected and published the cases. For example, in Hall v. Bell, 47 Mass. (6 Met.) 431 (1843), the citation is to volume 47 of Massachusetts Reports, which, like United States Reports, was started in the latter half of the 19th century and incorporated into the series a number of prior editions originally published privately, and began numbering from that point; "6 Met." refers to the 6th volume that had originally been published privately by Theron Metcalf. An example of a case cited to a reporter that has not been subsequently incorporated into an officially published series is Pierson v. Post, 3 Cai. 175 (N.Y. Sup. Ct. 1804), reported in volume 3 of Caines' Reports, page 175, named for George Caines, who had been appointed to report New York cases; the case was before the New York Supreme Court of Judicature (now defunct). Most states gave up this practice in the mid-to-late 19th century, but Delaware persisted until 1920.

Some states, notably California and New York, have their own citation systems that differ significantly from the various federal and national standards. In California, the year is placed between the names of the parties and the reference to the case reporter; in New York, the year is wrapped in brackets instead of parentheses, while California uses brackets for parenthetical explanations of a case's holding or relevance. Both New York and California styles wrap an entire citation in parentheses when used as a stand-alone sentence to support the preceding sentence, although New York places the terminating period outside the parentheses, whereas California places it inside. New York wraps just the reporter and page references in parentheses when the citation is used as a clause.

Either way, both state styles differ from the national/Bluebook style of simply dropping in the citation as a separate sentence without further adornment. Both systems use less punctuation and spacing in their reporter abbreviations.

For example, assuming that it is being placed as a stand-alone sentence, the Brown case above would be cited (using the official reporter) to a New York court as:

- (People v. Brown, 20 NY2d 238 [1967]).

And, again, as a stand-alone sentence, the famous Greenman product liability case would be cited to a California court as:

- (Greenman v. Yuba Power Products, Inc. (1963) 59 Cal.2d 57.)

=== Unpublished decisions ===
A growing number of court decisions are not published in case reporters. For example, only 7% of the opinions of the California intermediate courts (the Courts of Appeal) are published each year. This is mainly because judges certify only significant decisions for publication, due to the massive number of frivolous appeals flowing through the courts and the importance of avoiding information overload.

It is also argued that this is in part because in many states, especially California, the legislature has failed to expand the judiciary to keep up with population growth (for various political and fiscal reasons). To deal with their crushing caseloads, many judges prefer to write shorter-than-normal opinions that dispose of minor issues in the case in a sentence or two. They avoid publishing such abbreviated opinions, however, so as not to risk creating bad precedents.

Attorneys have several options in citing "unpublished" decisions:

- For cases that have not been published or put in an electronic database, or very recently decided cases that have not yet been published or put in an electronic database, a citation to the case's docket number before the court that decided it is required.
  - Groucho Marx Prods. v. Playboy Enters., No. 77 Civ. 1782 (S.D.N.Y. Dec. 30, 1977) – a decision of the U.S. District Court for the Southern District of New York; the docket number and specific date allow a researcher to track down the printed copy maintained by the court if needed (legal citation forms strongly prefer citations to traditional printed resources).
- Even though only some decisions of the U.S. Courts of Appeal are considered "published" (those appearing in Federal Reporter), Thomson West has recently started making available all decisions officially considered "unpublished" in a separate publication called Federal Appendix (abbreviated "F. App'x").
- Cases intentionally left officially unpublished are nonetheless often "published" on computer services, such as LexisNexis and Westlaw. These services have their own citation formats based on the year of the case, an abbreviation indicating the computer service (or a specific database of that computer service), and an identification number; citations to online databases also usually include the case's docket number and the specific date when it was decided (due to the preference for citation to traditional printed resources). Examples include:
  - Fuqua Homes, Inc. v. Beattie, No. 03-3587, 2004 WL 2495842 (8th Cir. Nov. 8, 2004) – a case found on the Westlaw electronic database, decided by the U.S. Court of Appeals for the Eighth Circuit; the citation includes the case's original docket number (No. 03-3587), and a citation to the electronic database that indicates the date of decision, the database (WL for Westlaw) and a unique serial number in that database (2495842).
  - Chavez v. Metro. Dist. Comm'n, No. 3:02CV458(MRK), 2004 U.S. Dist. LEXIS 11266 (D. Conn. June 1, 2004) – a case decided by the U.S. District Court for the District of Connecticut; the citation includes the case's original docket number (No. 3:02CV458(MRK)), the date of decision, the database (U.S. Dist. LEXIS, indicating the LexisNexis database for U.S. District Court cases), and a unique serial number in that database (11266).

Some court systems—such as the California state court system—forbid attorneys to cite unpublished cases as precedent. Other systems allow citation of unpublished cases only under specific circumstances. For example, in Kentucky, unpublished cases from that state's courts can only be cited if the case was decided after January 1, 2003, and "there is no published opinion that would adequately address the issue before the court". From 2004 to 2006, federal judges debated whether the Federal Rules of Appellate Procedure (FRAP) should be amended so that unpublished cases in all circuits could be cited as precedent. In 2006, the Supreme Court, over the objection of several hundred judges and lawyers, adopted a new Rule 32.1 of FRAP requiring that federal courts allow citation of unpublished cases. The rule took effect on January 1, 2007.

=== Vendor-neutral citations ===
With the rise of the web, many courts placed new cases on websites. Some were published while others never lost their "unpublished" status. The major legal citation systems required cites to the officially published page numbers, in which publishers such as West Publishing claimed a copyright interest.

A vendor-neutral citation movement led to provisions being made for citations to web-based cases and other legal materials. A few courts modified their rules to specifically take into account cases "published" on the web.

An example of a vendor-neutral citation:

- Equal. Found. of Greater Cincinnati, Inc. v. City of Cincinnati, 1997 FED App. 0318P (6th Cir.) – a 1997 case decided by the U.S. Court of Appeals for the Sixth Circuit; the citation to the numbering system adopted by the court ("1997 FED App. 0318P") eliminates the need to cite to a specific vendor's product, in this case Thomson West's Federal Reporter (i.e., 128 F.3d 289).

=== Pinpoint citations ===
In practice, most lawyers go one step farther, once they have developed the correct citation for a case using the rules discussed above. Most court opinions contain holdings on multiple issues, so lawyers need to cite to the page that contains the specific holding they wish to invoke in their own case. Such citations are known as pinpoint citations, "pin cites", or "jump cites".

For example, in Roe v. Wade, the U.S. Supreme Court held that the word "person" as used in the Fourteenth Amendment does not include the unborn. That particular holding appears on page 158 of the volume in which the Roe decision was published. A full pin cite to Roe for that holding would be as follows:

- Roe v. Wade, 410 U.S. 113, 158 (1973).

And a parallel cite to all three U.S. Supreme Court reporters, combined with pin cites for all three, would produce:

- Roe v. Wade, 410 U.S. 113, 158, 93 S. Ct. 705, 729, 35 L. Ed. 2d 147, 180 (1973).

But in its opinions, the Court usually provides a direct pin cite only to the official reporter. The two unofficial reporters, when they reprint the Court's opinions, add on parallel cites to each other, but do not add pin cites. Therefore, a citation to Roe v. Wade in a later Supreme Court decision as viewed on Lexis or Westlaw would appear as follows:

- Roe v. Wade, 410 U.S. 113, 158, 93 S. Ct. 705, 35 L. Ed. 2d 147 (1973).

Even then, such citations are still quite lengthy, and may look quite mysterious and intimidating to laypersons when they read court opinions. Since the 1980s, there has been an ongoing debate among American judges as to whether they should relegate such lengthy citations to footnotes to improve the readability of their opinions, as strongly urged by Bryan A. Garner, one of the leading authors on legal writing and style. Most judges do relegate some citations to footnotes, but jurists such as Justice Stephen Breyer and Judge Richard Posner refuse to use footnotes in their opinions.

=== Types of citations ===
There are two types of citations: proprietary and public domain citations. There are many citation guides; the most commonly acknowledged is called The Bluebook: A Uniform System of Citation, compiled by the Columbia Law Review, Harvard Law Review, University of Pennsylvania Law Review, and Yale Law Journal. Public domain citations refer to the official reporters, rather than a publication service such as Westlaw, LexisNexis, particular legal journals, or specialization-specific reporters. States with their own unique style for court documents and case opinions also publish their own style guides, which include information on their citation rules.

== See also ==
- Oxford Standard for Citation Of Legal Authorities (OSCOLA)
- Citation of Canadian legislation
- Category:Case law reporters
- Citator
- German legal citation
- Law report
- Legal research
- Template for citing cases on Wikipedia
