= Benjamin J. Greenberg =

Canadian judge (1933–2019)

Benjamin J. Greenberg (December 2, 1933 – June 3, 2019) served as a judge for the Quebec Superior Court between 1976 and 1998.

Greenberg was a graduate of the McGill University Faculty of Law, where he served as Executive Editor for the McGill Law Journal.

After serving on the Superior Court of Quebec, he acted as an arbitrator and mediator, mainly in international arbitration and Canadian commercial arbitration. Greenberg practiced law at Dunton Rainville between 2014 and 2019.
