= Brigitte Gouin =

Canadian judge with the Court of Québec

Brigitte Gouin is a Canadian judge with the Court of Québec. She is a graduate (BCL 1977) of the McGill University Faculty of Law, where she served as a senior editor for the McGill Law Journal. Over her career, she has presided over a variety of cases, including a 2011 case involving current Canadian MP Nicola Di Iorio.
