= Suzanne Coupal =

Suzanne Coupal was a justice with the Court of Quebec. She retired to become a painter, working full-time in her studio in Montreal. She is a graduate of the McGill University Faculty of Law, where she served as Circulations Editor for the McGill Law Journal.
