= AGLC =

AGLC may refer to:

- Alberta Gaming, Liquor and Cannabis Commission, an agency of the Government of the Canadian province of Alberta
- Australian Guide to Legal Citation, the predominant style guide for law journals in Australia
- Atlanta Gas Light Company, the largest natural gas wholesaler in the Southeastern US
- AGLC Imbel, a .308 sniper rifle manufactured in Brasil
