= Quebec Court of Appeal =

Highest court in Quebec, Canada

- Logo of the court since 2026
- Interactive map of Quebec Court of Appeal
- 45°30′26″N 73°33′15″W
- Established: May 30, 1849,
- Coordinates: 45°30′26″N 73°33′15″W
- Composition method: Appointed by the governor general of Canada
- Authorised by: Courts of Justice Act
- Appeals to: Supreme Court of Canada
- Judge term length: Mandatory retirement at age 75
- Number of positions: 22
- Website: courdappelduquebec.ca

Chief Justice of Quebec
- Currently: Manon Savard
- Since: June 11, 2020

The Court of Appeal of Quebec (sometimes referred to as Quebec Court of Appeal or QCA; French: la Cour d'appel du Québec) is the highest judicial court in Quebec, Canada. It hears cases in Quebec City and Montreal.

== History ==
The court was created on May 30, 1849, as the Court of Queen's Bench (French: Cour du Banc de la Reine) – or Court of King's Bench (Cour du Banc du Roi) depending on the gender of the current monarch serving as head of state first of the United Kingdom, then of Canada. The court's judges had jurisdiction to try criminal cases until 1920, when it was transferred to the Superior Court. In 1974, it was officially renamed the Quebec Court of Appeal.

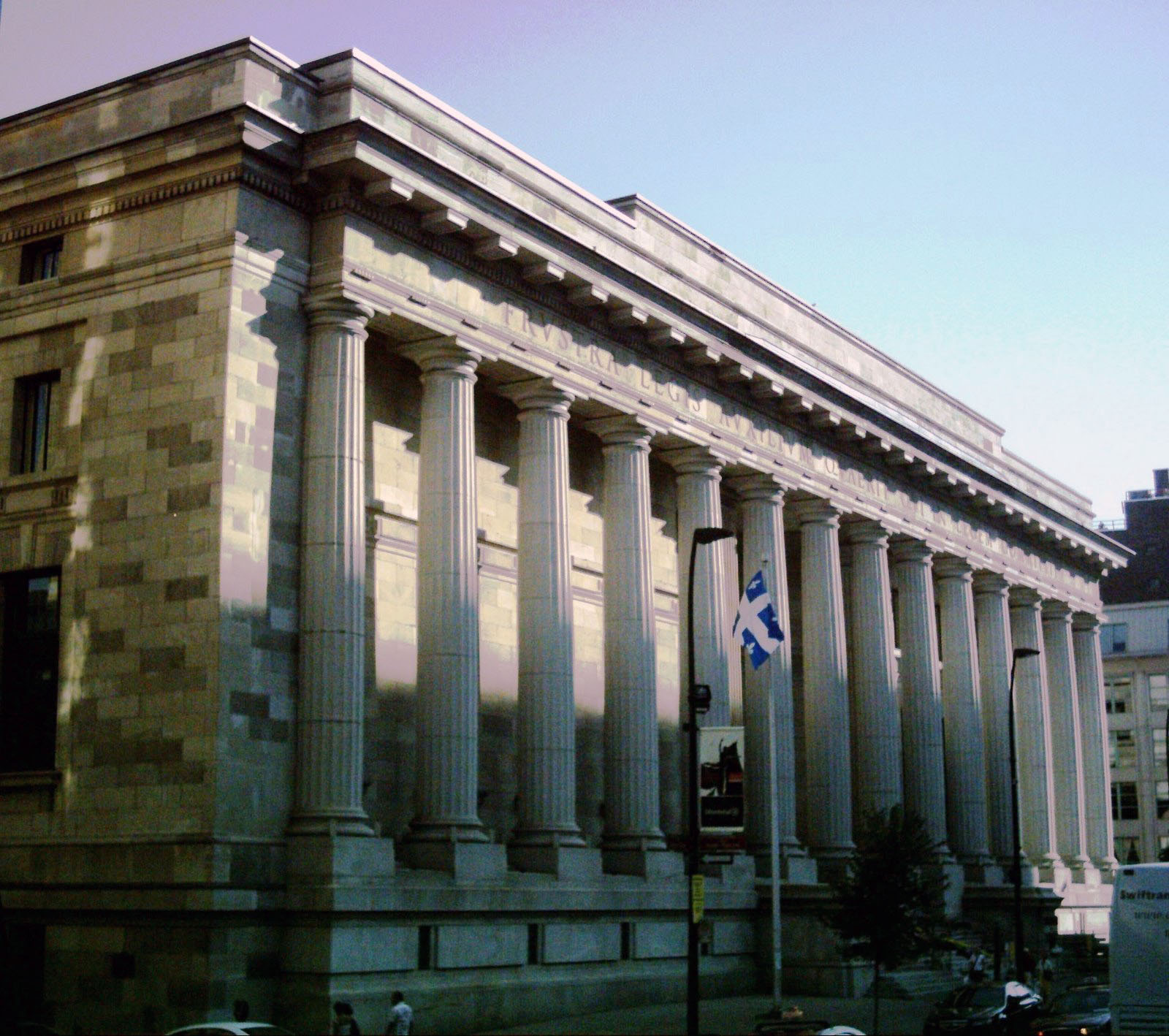
Édifice Ernest-Cormier, the Quebec Court of Appeal building on Rue Notre-Dame in Old Montreal.

On 30 June 2026, the court unveiled a new logo to replace its use of the provincial coat of arms.

== Jurisdiction ==
Under the Code of Civil Procedure of Quebec and the Criminal Code, someone wishing to appeal a decision of either the Superior Court of Quebec or the Court of Quebec generally has 30 days to file an appeal with the Court of Appeal. Final judgments in civil cases are appellable as of right if the amount in dispute is at least $60,000 in dispute to be heard. The Court of Appeal will overrule a lower court decision if it is "incorrect" on a question of law or if a "palpable and overriding error" was made on questions of fact or mixed fact and law. The Court of Appeal almost never hears witnesses, and lawyers' oral and written submissions are kept to strict maximum lengths. A normal case will take several months from filing of an appeal to a decision by the Court of Appeal, but the court may hear an appeal within hours or days in an emergency.

Appeals of Court of Appeal decisions are heard before the Supreme Court of Canada in Ottawa, but only if leave to appeal is granted either by the Supreme Court of Canada or by the Court of Appeal. Notwithstanding this, in very limited circumstances, a decision of the Court of Appeal may be appealed to the Supreme Court of Canada as of right.

The ability of the Supreme Court of Canada, which has six of its nine justices from common law provinces and only three from the civil law province of Quebec, to overrule the Court of Appeal of Quebec has occasionally been raised as a political issue by Quebec nationalists, who contend that it erodes Quebec's distinctive legal culture.

Perhaps the most significant decision of the Court of Appeal was Morgentaler v The Queen (1974), in which the Court of Appeal overturned a jury decision acquitting Montreal doctor Henry Morgentaler of performing an abortion, despite Morgentaler publicly admitting that he had done so. This was the first time in Canada that a jury acquittal had been replaced by a conviction, on appeal, rather than a new trial being ordered. The Court of Appeal was overturned by the Supreme Court of Canada in 1975. Subsequently, Parliament amended the Criminal Code removing the ability of provincial courts of appeal to substitute jury acquittals with convictions.

== Composition ==
As a "Superior Court" under section 96 of the Constitution Act, 1867, Court of Appeal judges are appointed by the governor general of Canada on the advice of the prime minister of Canada (in practical terms the advice is always followed). Appointees must be members of the Quebec Bar, but need not have had previous experience as a judge. However, appointees almost always have some experience as a judge, usually on the Superior Court of Quebec. The quorum of the Court of Appeal of Quebec for appeals on the merits is generally three judges, but the court has also sat five judges in exceptional circumstances, and in one recent extremely exceptional case, the court sat seven judges. However, for Applications seeking leave to appeal and most other applications in the course of the proceeding, quorum is composed of only one judge of the Court of Appeal.

Originally, the court had four judges, including the chief justice. It is currently constituted of 22 judges, including the chief Justice. By statute, fifteen of the judges must reside in Montreal, while seven must reside in Quebec City.

== Current judges ==
Position	Name	Appointed	Nominated by	Position prior to appointment
Chief Justice	Manon Savard	April 26, 2013; June 11, 2020	Stephen Harper; Justin Trudeau	Quebec Superior Court
Justice	Martin Vauclair	December 17, 2013	Harper	Quebec Superior Court
Justice	Geneviève Marcotte	April 10, 2014	Harper	Quebec Superior Court
Justice	Marie-Josée Hogue	June 19, 2015	Harper	Lawyer at McCarthy Tétrault
Justice	Patrick Healy	October 19, 2016	J. Trudeau	Court of Quebec
Justice	Simon Ruel	June 21, 2017	J. Trudeau	Quebec Superior Court
Justice	Jocelyn F. Rancourt	June 21, 2017	J. Trudeau	Quebec Superior Court
Justice	Suzanne Gagné	November 29, 2017	J. Trudeau	Quebec Superior Court
Justice	Genevieve Cotnam	June 26, 2018	J. Trudeau	Court of Quebec
Justice	Stephen Hamilton	August 29, 2018	J. Trudeau	Quebec Superior Court
Justice	Stéphane Sansfaçon	January 31, 2019	J. Trudeau	Quebec Superior Court
Justice	Michel Beaupré	March 8, 2019	J. Trudeau	Quebec Superior Court
Justice	Benoit Moore	June 22, 2019	J. Trudeau	Quebec Superior Court
Justice	Guy Cournoyer	October 1, 2020	J. Trudeau	Quebec Superior Court
Justice	Sophie Lavallée	October 1, 2020	J. Trudeau	Professor of Law, Université Laval
Justice	Christine Baudouin	November 19, 2020	J. Trudeau	Quebec Superior Court
Justice	Frédéric Bachand	November 19, 2020	J. Trudeau	Quebec Superior Court
Justice	Peter Kalichman	April 27, 2021	J. Trudeau	Quebec Superior Court
Justice	Lori Renée Weitzman	May 31, 2023	J. Trudeau	Court of Quebec
Justice	Eric Hardy	October 10, 2023	J. Trudeau	Quebec Superior Court
Justice	Judith Harvie	December 18, 2023	J. Trudeau	Quebec Superior Court
Justice	Myriam Lachance	June 18, 2024	J. Trudeau	Quebec Superior Court
Justice	Christian Immer	January 27, 2025	J. Trudeau	Quebec Superior Court

Supernumerary judge

Position	Name	Appointed	Nominated By	Position Prior to Appointment
Justice	Yves-Marie Morissette*	November 7, 2002	Jean Chrétien	Professor at McGill Law
Justice	François Doyon*	May 7, 2004	Paul Martin	Court of Quebec; Assistant chief prosecutor
Justice	Julie Dutil*	September 24, 2004	Martin	Quebec Superior Court
Justice	Marie-France Bich*	September 24, 2004	Martin	Professor at Universite de Montreal Faculty of Law
Justice	Guy Gagnon*	September 27, 2009	Harper	Court of Quebec
Justice	Mark Schrager*	June 13, 2014	Harper	Quebec Superior Court
Justice	Robert Mainville*	July 1, 2014	Harper	Federal Court of Appeal

== Former justices ==
- Julien Chouinard (1974 – September 1979)
- Claire L'Heureux-Dubé (1979 – April 1987)
- Antonio Lamer (1978 – March 1980)
- Louis LeBel (June 1984 – January 2000)
- Morris Fish (June 1989 – August 2003)
- Marie Deschamps (March 1992 – August 2002)
- Jean-Louis Baudouin (May 1989 – 2008)
- Richard Wagner (February 2011 – October 2012)
- Clément Gascon (April 10, 2012 – June 9, 2014)
- Joseph Nuss
- J. Michel Robert

=== Chief Justice of Lower Canada ===
- William Smith (judge, born 1728) 1791–1793
- William Osgoode 1794–1801
- John Elmsley 1802–1805
- Henry Allcock 1805–1808
- Jonathan Sewell 1808–1838
- Sir James Stuart, 1st Baronet 1838–1841

=== Chief Justice of Canada East ===
- Sir James Stuart, 1st Baronet 1841–49

=== Chief Justice of Court of Queen's Bench ===
- Sir James Stuart, 1st Baronet 1849–53
