= Jean-Louis Baudouin =

Canadian jurist and judge

The Honourable Jean-Louis Baudouin OC (born August 8, 1938) is a lawyer and professor of law. He was judge of the Court of Appeal of Quebec between 1989 and 2008.

Born in Paris, France, Baudouin obtained his BCL in 1958 at the McGill University Faculty of Law, where he served as a Comment Editor at the McGill Law Journal. He also served as the vice-Chairman of the Law Reform Commission of Canada and is a professor at the University of Montreal.

In 2007, McGill University awarded him a Doctor of Law, honoris causa (LLD). In 2014, he was made an Officer of the Order of Canada "for his contributions to the advancement of civil law in Canada as a professor and judge for the Quebec Court of Appeal".

== Books ==
- Tort law in Canada
- Les Obligations
