= Australian Guide to Legal Citation =

Guide for the citation style used in legal writing in Australia

- AGLC4 Cover Cover of the AGLC's 4th edition (2018)
- AGLC4 (ISBN 9780646976389); AGLC3 (ISBN 9780646527390); AGLC2 (ISBN 0732516188); AGLC1 (ISBN 0734013485)
- Country: Australia
- Language: English
- Discipline: Legal citation
- Publisher: Melbourne University Law Review Association (all editions); and Melbourne Journal of International Law (3rd & 4th editions)
- Published: 2018, 2019, 2020 (4th ed) (Note: Includes reprints with minor corrections made after publication. Both the third and fourth versions were reprinted twice.); 2010, 2011, 2012 (3rd ed); 2002 (2nd ed); 1998 (1st ed)
- Media type: Ringbound paperback and PDF
- No. of books: AGLC4 (3 versions); AGLC3 (3 versions); AGLC2 (1 version); AGLC1 (1 version)
- Website: About the AGLC

The Australian Guide to Legal Citation (AGLC) is published by the Melbourne University Law Review in collaboration with the Melbourne Journal of International Law and seeks to provide the Australian legal community with a standard for citing legal sources. There is no single standard for legal citation in Australia, but the AGLC is the most widely used.

== History ==
By 1998, there existed a large number of competing styles for citing and referencing legal authorities in Australian law publications but one study identified the four major guides:

- Derek French, How to Cite Legal Authorities (London: Blackstone Press, 1996);
- Harvard Law Review Association, The Bluebook: A Uniform System of Citation (Cambridge, MA: HLRA, 1996, 16th ed);
- University of Chicago Manual of Legal Citation (Rochester: Lawyers Cooperative Publishing, 1989);
- McGill Law Review, Canadian Guide to Uniform Legal Citation (Montreal: Carswell, 1998, 4th ed).

There was no major, generally accepted Australian guide and law journals and law schools produced their own style guides. One of those guides was the Melbourne University Law Review Style Guide which, in 1997, had reached its third edition.

The first edition of the Australian Guide to Legal Citation ("AGLC1") was published in 1998, a year which saw the publication of three other general guides:

- Colin Fong, Australian Legal Citation - A Guide ("Fong's guide");
- Pearl Rozenberg, Australian Guide to Uniform Legal Citation ("Law Book Co. guide"); and
- Anita Stuhmcke, Legal Referencing ("Butterworths guide").

Fong's guide was prepared by Colin Fong, then Research Librarian with Sydney solicitors Allen Allen & Hemsley and now an adjunct lecturer at the UNSW Law School. While one reviewer described it as a "remarkably useful and sensible book", another reviewer conducted a comparative review of Fong's guide and AGLC1 and found Fong's guide a "quixotic work". The Law Book Co. guide had a second edition in 2003 and the Butterworths Guide a third edition in 2005.

=== AGLC1 ===
The AGLC1 contained general rules and examples for legal citation and specific rules for Australian primary law (cases and legislation) and secondary sources (journal articles, books and other materials). Its coverage of international legal materials was limited to Canada, New Zealand, the United Kingdom, the United States and some other basic international sources. It also had two appendices: commonly used abbreviations and a table of law reports. It also featured a concise Quick Reference Guide. It was "comprehensive and easy to use".

=== AGLC2 ===
The second edition ("AGLC2") in 2002 expanded its rules to include more sources: transcripts (court, television, and radio), explanatory memoranda to legislation, translations, parliamentary committee and royal commissions reports, the constitutional convention debates, speeches, and letters. It also addressed internet sources. It expanded its coverage of basic international sources: decisions of the European Court of Justice, the WTO, and GATT. In its general rules, it added a rule on the use of bibliographies. It also revised the AGLC1 rules to make them clearer and increased the number of examples.

=== AGLC3 ===
The third edition ("AGLC3") in 2010 added 14 chapters and divided the whole into 6 parts. The lists of information in AGLC2 were replaced with tables and all the AGLC2 examples were replaced with new examples and further examples given. The international legal materials (Part IV) were greatly expanded and the foreign jurisdictions (Part V) covered now include China, Hong Kong, France, Germany, Malaysia, Singapore, and South Africa. Some rules were changed: for example, citations of books now require publisher information.

AGLC3 is over 300 pages but "much of its length is due to the clear format and useful examples".

=== AGLC4 ===
The fourth edition ("AGLC4") was released in November 2018, combining secondary source rules into a single chapter on 'General Rules for Citing Secondary Sources'; it allows for cross referencing, and more kinds of materials have rules added, including intellectual property materials, podcasts, online secondary material, forthcoming journal articles, television episodes, social media posts, and journals that don't use a volume format.

=== AGLC5 ===
In 2023, the Melbourne University Law Review and Melbourne Journal of International Law established a committee to prepare the fifth edition ("AGLC5"), having sought submissions from professional, academic, and public stakeholders in respect of the following identified areas of improvement:

- Making the AGLC more comprehensive;
- Improving the structure of the AGLC;
- Where possible, simplifying the AGLC and improving its usability;
- Citing First Nations materials and making space for the decolonisation of legal scholarship;
- Updating rules on internet materials and moving the AGLC into the digital age; and
- Using gender-inclusive and culturally-sensitive language and examples.

As of March 2026, AGLC4 remains the most recent published edition.

== See also ==
- Case citation
- Legal citation signals
- ALWD Citation Manual (U.S.)
- The Bluebook: A Uniform System of Citation (U.S.)
- Canadian Guide to Uniform Legal Citation (Canada)
- Oxford Standard for Citation of Legal Authorities (U.K.)
