= Ronna Brott =

Canadian judge

Ronna Brott is an Associate Justice with the Ontario Superior Court. She is a graduate of the McGill University Faculty of Law, where she served as the circulation editor for the McGill Law Journal.
