= Philippine Reports =

Decisions of the Supreme Court of the Philippines

The Philippine Reports (Spanish: Jurisprudencia Filipina; lit. 'Philippine Jurisprudence') are the official record (law reports) of the Supreme Court of the Philippines. They include rulings, orders, case tables (list of every case decided) published in alphabetical order both by the name of the petitioner (the losing party in lower courts) and by the name of the respondent (the prevailing party below), and other proceedings.

Once printed and bound, decisions published in the Philippine Reports are the final version of court opinions and cannot be changed. Decisions published in the Philippine Reports also need not be authenticated. However, not all decisions of the Supreme Court are published in the Philippine Reports, with the justices holding final say as to which decisions are published.

== History ==
Publication of the Philippine Reports was mandated by Act No. 136 of the U.S.-instituted Second Philippine Commission, the law which established both the Supreme Court and the entire Philippine judiciary. First published in 1901, the Philippine Reports was to be styled in a manner substantially similar to that of the United States Reports, the official reporter of decisions of the Supreme Court of the United States, with an initial print run of 2,000 copies. In its early years, the Philippine Reports were published in annual volumes, and many cases of the Supreme Court published in those early volumes often dealt with issues more pertinent to members of the Philippines' upper class, as well as resolving other cases pertaining to the Philippine independence movement.

In 1905, the Second Philippine Commission abolished the office of reporter of decisions of the Supreme Court, and publication of the Philippine Reports passed to the Executive Bureau. This remained the case until 1916, when the Philippine Legislature passed the Administrative Code (Act No. 2656), later revised the next year following the passage of the Jones Law, which officially reinstated the office of reporter.

On July 3, 2023, as part of a modernization program spearheaded by Associate Justice Marvic Leonen, the Supreme Court launched an online portal where volumes of the Philippine Reports may be accessed and even downloaded for free, starting with the most recent volumes.

== Citation ==
Citation of cases published in the Philippine Reports is governed by the Stylebook of the Supreme Court of the Philippines (also known more succinctly as the Supreme Court Stylebook), first published in 2023 and replacing the older Manual of Judicial Writing. Philippine case citation borrows from the American practice, with the Stylebook referencing works such as the Bluebook as well as citation protocols elaborated in local manuals. As such, a case published in the Philippine Reports such as Disini v. Secretary of Justice, for example, would be cited as follows:

Disini v. Secretary of Justice, 727 Phil. 28 (2014)

To cite a case published in the Philippine Reports, include the case title in italics, the volume number, the abbreviation “Phil.” ("Jur. Fil." when citing cases in Spanish) and the first page of the case. When required to go into more detail such as when citing a quote from within the decision, the citation should also include the page where the quote is lifted from if applicable, as well as the surname of the ponente and the division of the Supreme Court that released the decision in brackets.

Some legal citation manuals discourage the use of the Philippine Reports for more recent decisions of the Supreme Court in favor of using the case's docket number and its citation in the privately published Supreme Court Reports Annotated, although the Supreme Court Stylebook requires that all cases be referred to as published in the Philippine Reports, or as it appears on the Supreme Court's website if the case in question has yet to be officially published in the Philippine Reports.
