= National Judicial Reference System =

The National Judicial Reference System (NJRS) is a project of the Income Tax Department of India which streamlines its tax litigation system. NJRS aims to be a comprehensive repository of all appeals and verdicts related to direct taxes in the country. The Income Tax Department is the largest litigant in India. NJRS helped the department decongest and streamline the backlog of litigation in various courts and Tribunals related to direct tax cases. The portal was launched in March 2015. Continuous improvements and public access are in progress. The portal enabled the department to monitor appeals progress through the appeal stages, undertake policy analysis for issues leading to rising litigation, and do research for strengthening their cases by taking reference from previous orders made by the courts tax appeals.

== Background ==
The Income Tax Department (ITD) is responsible for collecting Direct Taxes and administering the Income Tax Law and other direct tax statutes for Government of India. The department has offices in 510 cities and towns across India. There are 3420 assessment units in the department and a sanctioned strength of about 8600 at the level of ITOs and above. These are to increase to about 4500 and 11600 respectively as a result of the recently approved restructuring in the department.

Tax litigation is an integral component of any modern tax administration. It not only helps resolve disputes between the tax payers and the tax administration, it also helps in the interpretation of tax issues and in planning transactions.

The Indian Tax laws also provide an elaborate mechanism for resolution of tax disputes - both administrative involving the Commissioner of Income Tax (Appeals) and various Alternative Dispute Resolution mechanisms, as well as through the appeal jurisdictions of the Income Tax Appellate Tribunal, High Courts, and the Supreme Court of India. However, increasing volumes of litigation in various tribunals and courts, the lengthy wait for finalization of tax disputes, and varied interpretations of tax law taken by both tax officials and various judicial fora have become a cause of concern. The CAG, in its Performance Audit Report No. - 20 of 2009–10, stated that the dimensions of disputes in income tax are staggering and that it takes a long time to settle tax disputes. The report also stated that the Income Tax Department lacks credible and reliable data on the volume and impact of appeals, which points to weak internal controls. Inadequate internal control, in turn, may lead to the expiration of the statute of limitations for appeals, as well as delays in implementation of appellate orders. The CAG report recommended automation of receipt and disposal of appellate orders.

Besides maintenance of proper litigation database, there is also a need to continuously identify contentious legal issues, analyse them and take corrective action to clarify the law. An Office Memorandum of the Central Board of Direct Taxes stated that a large part of litigation in the Direct Taxes matters involves interpretation of legal provisions. The memorandum also stated that inconsistent approaches on contentious legal issues by officers of the department give rise to further litigation. There have also been suggestions to identify and flag areas through the department's website, when there are issues relating to interpretation of the tax law, so as to give taxpayers an insight into existing areas of litigation so they can avoid taking litigation prone positions in their tax returns.

The NJRS project was taken up by the Income Tax Department to create an electronic platform as a replacement for the manual method of managing litigation.

NJRS has two components:

- Appeals Repository & Management System - an electronic database of all pending appeals at Income Tax Appellate Tribunal(ITAT), High Courts (HCs) and Supreme Court of India (SC).
- Judicial Research & Reference System - an electronic database of all orders/judgments of ITAT, Authority of Advance Ruling, HCs and SC.

Both databases are cross referenced, have suitable metadata & key-phrases, and have enterprise-class search engines to enable identification of disputed issues across cases for improved decision making.

== Objective ==
The project for setting up a National Judicial Reference System (NJRS) and the project for setting up an Institutional Mechanism for formulating a 'Departmental View' on contentious legal issues are the two key measures that were taken up by the Central Board of Direct Taxes to streamline the litigation management system in the department.

NJRS was proposed to be a comprehensive electronic database of all appeals and judgments in Direct Tax cases pending before various judicial authorities i.e. Income Tax Appellate Tribunal, High Courts and the Supreme Court of India. It has automation in the workflows of the Judicial wings of the department. The system links the units engaged in litigation work in the department and the units engaged in tracking tax appeals on a 24/7 basis. It also acts as a knowledge repository that assists officials in issuing consistent orders utilising the judicial information available in it online.

The NJRS is able to eliminate similar cases, weed out weak ones, and help make stronger arguments before various tribunals and courts. NJRS facilitates Computer-assisted legal research and provides easy accessibility to judicial information, case laws and judgments, thereby enabling the tax officers to take a more informed and consistent approach in tax audits. It also assists the Department's Representatives/Counsels in improving the quality of representation before Tribunal & Courts and enhancing the success rate of the department in appeals.

The National Judicial Reference System (NJRS) thus functions as a tool for effective tracking and monitoring of Appeals at various stages, reducing disputed tax demand by targeting high demand cases, as a comprehensive reference system, and a decision support system to achieve efficiency in the tax litigation process of Income Tax Department (ITD), Government of India.

== Implementation Approach ==
The project was being implemented through an Implementation Agency engaged through an open competitive bid process in April, 2014. The Implementation Agency was a consortium of a Systems Integrator - NSDL eGovernance Infrastructure Ltd and a company specializing in legal databases - Skorydov Systems Pvt Ltd.

The project was implemented on a Public Private Partnership (PPP) model, where the technology risk has been passed on to the IA. The IA has the flexibility to generate additional revenues (besides the project payments from the government) by utilizing the judicial database for commercial purposes, subject to certain restrictions.

The project leveraged the advancements in computerisation of the registry functions of the Tribunals and Courts achieved under the e-Courts Mission Mode Project taken up under the National e-Governance Plan(NeGP). As the case filing, scrutiny, and case registration services have been automated in the courts, the NJRS project allows for collation of data from such external data sources. The Income Tax Department in India has also developed several computer systems for its own internal workflows and to manage the data base of the returns filed by the tax payers. The unifying factor across these computer systems is the Permanent Account Number (PAN) allocated to identify each tax payer uniquely. The data collected from the external court systems is collated by the NJRS with the help of taxpayers' information stored in the PAN database and other computer systems of the tax department. In addition, the appeal case files are scanned through a network of 28 regional scanning centers specially established under the project across the country. The scanned case files are processed at a BPO-like facility for writing case summaries, keyphrases, metadata, and linking the case files with the case data obtained from external court systems.

== Logo ==
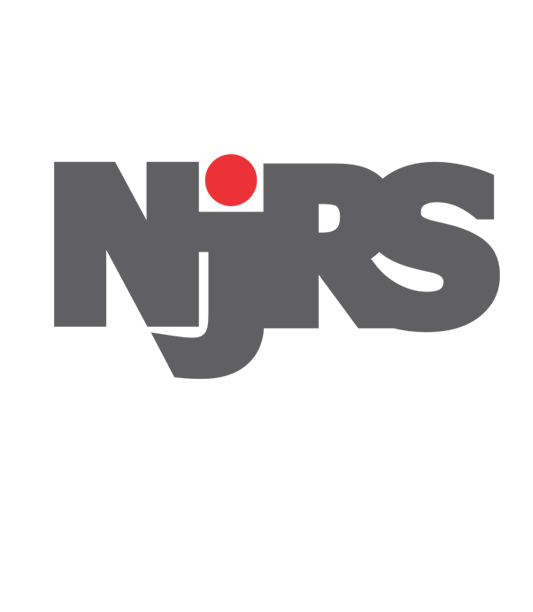

The NJRS logo was conceived with the goal of creating a visual perception of Knowledge, Transparency and Reliability. The bold, clean font and the choice of a flat colour scheme using red and black colours are used to create this presence.

The red dot is a specific choice in the design language. As the system is a data recording repository of appeals and judgments, the red dot is a visual cue for the "recording" or assimilation of knowledge. This creates an association with audio visual devices which have a similar red icon for recording information.

Finally, black and white colours also represent clarity and eliminate ambiguity, further emphasizing the transparency that this system holds.

== NJRS Citation ==
The Citation nomenclature followed within NJRS Case citation#India helps identify any judgment / order uniquely. e.g. * Chandra Ranganathan & Ors. v. Commissioner of Income-tax 2009-LL-1021, which refers to NJRS citations.

This Citation further allows to add the Authority / Court name after the citation. This does not form an integral part of Citation but can be used to enhance the value of the Citation. e.g. * Chandra Ranganathan & Ors. v. Commissioner of Income-tax 2009-LL-1021-SC, which refers to NJRS citations with additional Court Name. Here, in this case - SC stands for Supreme Court.
