= CanLII =

Canadian non-profit legal database

- Type: Non-profit
- Purpose: Legal education
- Parent organization: Federation of Law Societies of Canada
- Website: www.canlii.org/en/

The Canadian Legal Information Institute (CanLII; French: Institut canadien d'information juridique) is a non-profit organization created and funded by the Federation of Law Societies of Canada in 2001 on behalf of its 14 member societies. CanLII is a member of the Free Access to Law Movement, which includes the primary stakeholders involved in free, open publication of law throughout the world.

== Background ==
CanLII offers free public access to over 2.4 million documents across more than 300 case law and legislative databases. The official websites of provincial governments, which provide access to primary legislative documents, are linked to CANLII online. The CANLII database is one of the most comprehensive collections of Canadian federal, provincial and territorial legislation. It is used by lawyers, legal professionals and the general public, with usage averaging over 30,000 visits per day. The case law database is reportedly growing at a rate of approximately 120,000 new cases each year, 20% of which are historic cases which are included to enrich existing databases.

== History ==
In April 2014, CanLII launched CanLII Connects, a legal community sourced publication and discussion platform for case law summaries and commentaries.

In March 2018, CanLII launched a commentary program including law reviews, e-books, articles, public legal education materials, and reports.

In June 2020, CanLII started actively promoting the CanLII guest writer program. As of February 2024, CanLII is piloting the use of a large language model to generate artificial intelligence case summaries.

Other websites will often use CanLII as their primary source when referring to Canadian case law, and as of the 10th Edition of the Canadian Guide to Uniform Legal Citation, is the designated preferred citation, in the absence of official court-issued neutral citations.

In November 2024, CanLII filed a copyright lawsuit against an AI company.
