= Folketingstidende =

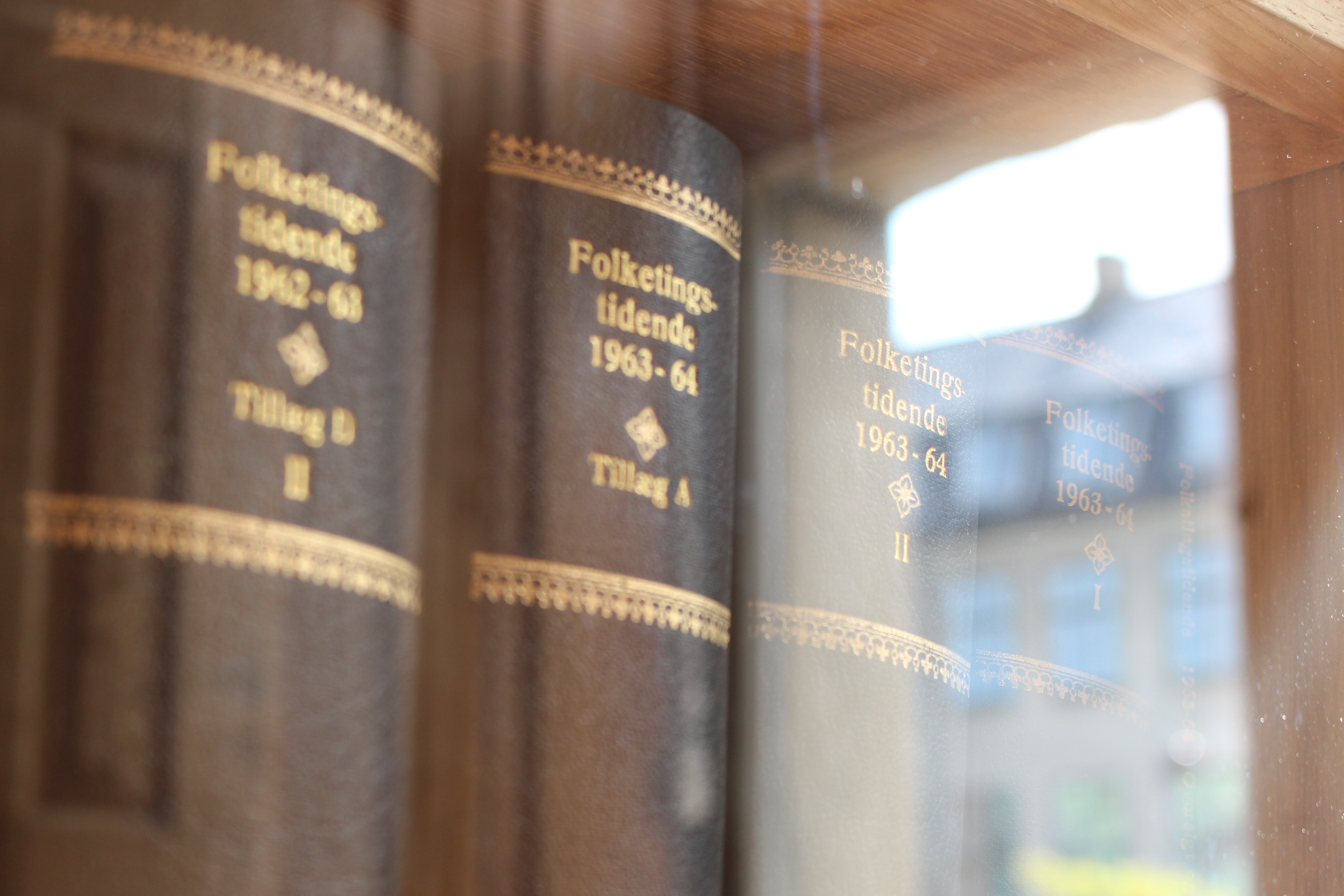
Books with Folketingstidende set up in the Børsbygningen at Dansk Erhverv.

Folketingstidende is an official publication issued by the Danish parliament, the Folketing. Folketingstidende contains summaries of negotiations conducted in the Folketing and a number of supplements.

Folketingstidende replaced Rigsdagstidende—a yearly publication issued by Rigsdagen, the previous Danish parliament—in 1953 after the transition to a unicameral system due to the current constitution of 1953. It used to be a yearly publication, but since 6 October 2009 it is only issued on the Internet.
