= Melbourne Journal of International Law =

- Discipline: International law
- Language: English
- Edited by: Timothy Gilling, Rohan Hodges and Thomas-Étienne Mudie

Publication details
- History: 2000–present
- Publisher: Melbourne Journal of International Law Association (Australia)
- Frequency: Biannual

Standard abbreviations
- Bluebook: Melb. J. Int'l L.
- ISO 4: Melb. J. Int. Law

Indexing
- ISSN: 1444-8602
- LCCN: 2001222127
- OCLC no.: 45753327

Links
- Journal homepage; Online access; Online archive

The Melbourne Journal of International Law is a biannual peer-reviewed law review affiliated with the Melbourne Law School. It covers both public and private international law. It was established in 2000 and is one of two student-run law journals at the University of Melbourne, the other being the Melbourne University Law Review, which covers Australian law.

The editorial process is managed by an editorial board comprising approximately 70 law students from the Melbourne Law School. This board operates under the guidance of three editors, faculty advisors, and an advisory board.

In collaboration with the Melbourne University Law Review it produces the Australian Guide to Legal Citation.

== History ==
=== Establishment ===
The journal was established in 2000 by its founding editors: Suzan Davies, Peter Henley, Kalika Jayasekera, Amanda Rologas, and Tracy Whiriskey, with the Law Faculty of the University of Melbourne, in response to the shortage of academic and practice-oriented material dealing with the Asia-Pacific region's relationship with international law.

=== Objectives ===
The journal is a generalist international law review. Its content encompasses both private and public international law. The journal was established as a forum for academics to publish modern perspectives on international law.

=== Advance Access Policy ===
In 2016 an advanced access policy was introduced. Articles that have passed the entire editing process well before final publication in their corresponding issue are uploaded on the journal's website as an advance copy. This ensures that the author's work is disseminated as early as possible. Advanced versions are subject to change prior to the final print and online publication of the article.

=== Past Symposiums, Special Features, and Special Focus Issues ===
The journal produces symposium issues devoted to particular aspects of international law. It also publishes "features" if one or several articles provide an in-depth focus on a topical issue of international law, or otherwise to highlight pieces of a unique contribution to international law academia.

=== Australian Guide to Legal Citation ===
The journal assists the Melbourne University Law Review in its publication of the Australian Guide to Legal Citation ('AGLC'). The Australian Guide to Legal Citation is the most widely used legal citation style-guide in the Australian legal community. The AGLC is in its 4th edition and was published in November 2018.

== Melbourne Journal of International Law Prize ==
The "Melbourne Journal of International Law Prize" for 'Outstanding Scholarship in International Law is awarded annually to an author whose article or commentary was published in the previous calendar year. The prize is judged by a panel of three international law scholars appointed by the editors. At least one member of the panel must be a member of the journal's Advisory Board.

== Sir Kenneth Bailey Memorial Lecture ==
The journal has co-hosted the Sir Kenneth Bailey Memorial Lecture with the Melbourne Law School since 2016. It was inaugurated in 1999, at the Commemoration of the Centenary of the 1899 Hague Peace Conference held at the University of Melbourne. The lecture, which focuses on the international legal order, honors the Fourth Dean of the Melbourne Law School, Kenneth Hamilton Bailey, who played a significant part in Australia's contribution to the formation of the United Nations.

Past lectures have been recorded and uploaded on the journal's website.

== Editors ==
The following persons are or have been editors:

- 2026 – Timothy Gilling, Rohan Hodges and Thomas-Étienne Mudie
- 2025 – Pui Lam Lo, Jacinta Speer and Egor Vishniakov
- 2024 – Felix Geake-Ransome, Megan Stevens and Joseph Zivny
- 2023 – Jasmine Gan, Jonathan Ta, and Eleanor Twomey
- 2022 – Matthew Carlei, Tegan Evans, and Nick Hui
- 2021 – Jeremy Armour, Daniel Ho, and Eileen Yang
- 2020 – Betty Choi, Jake Fava, and Sophie Ward
- 2019 – Jake Herd, Sarah Waring, and Elizabeth Wright
- 2018 – Anna Boháčová, Eliah Castiello, and Michael McArdle
- 2017 – Mimi Oorlof, Lachlan Sievert, and Adaena Sinclair-Blakemore
- 2016 – Justin Browne, Kara Connolly, and Anna Saunders
- 2015 – Holly Cao, Monique MacRitchie, and James Nunez
- 2014 – Houston Ash, Ashley Kendall, and Sarah Sapuppo
- 2013 – Chelsea Driessen, Timothy Gorton, and Candice Parr
- 2012 – Martin Clark, Nuwan Dias, and Eamonn Kelly
- 2011 – Sam Naparstek, Tiong Tjin Saw, and Suzanne Zhou
- 2010 – Tim Farhall, Christopher Hibbard, and Mary Quinn
- 2009 – Laura Bellamy, Sara Dehm, and Jeremy Leung
- 2008 – Rebecca Hughes, May-Ling Low, and Zach Meyers
- 2007 – Brownwyn Reddan, Natasha Sung, and Robert Walker
- 2006 – Frances Dunn, Fergus Green, and Chian Kee
- 2005 – Laura Deschamps, Megan Donaldson, and Chris Thomas
- 2004 – Anthony Goh, Michael Jukes, and Mehnaz Yoosuf
- 2003 – Beth Midgley, Daniel Perkins, and Heidi Stabb
- 2002 – Fahim Ahad, Elliot Friedman, and Alexia Mayer
- 2001 – Claudio Bozzi, Andrew Hudson, Christopher Haan, and Jeldee Robertson
- 2000 – Suzan Davies, Kalika Jayasekera, Amanda Rologas, Peter Henley, and Tracy Whiriskey
