= Canadian Guide to Uniform Legal Citation =

Canadian legal citation standard

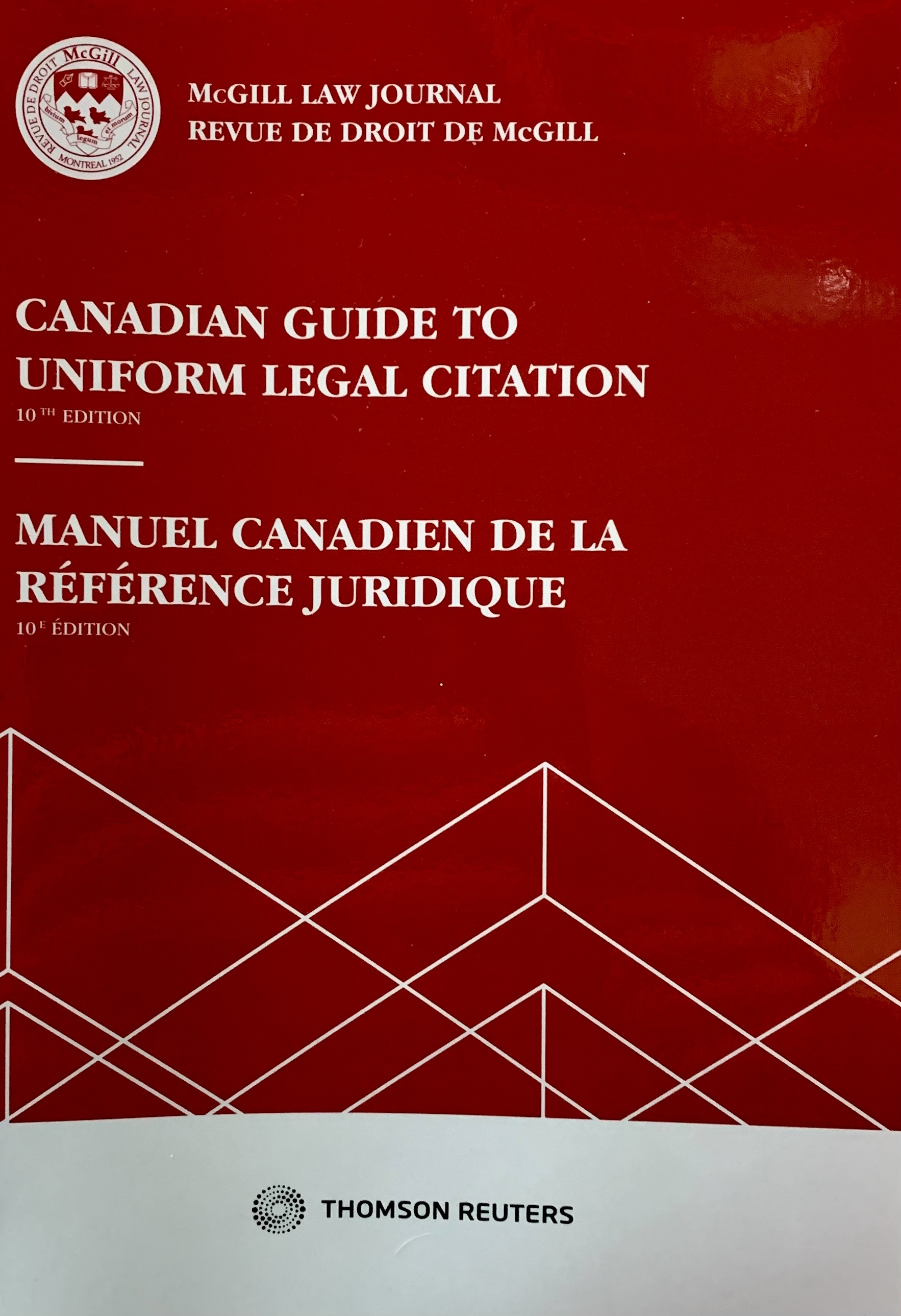
The McGill Guide 10th edition cover

The Canadian Guide to Uniform Legal Citation (McGill Guide or Red Book; French: Manuel canadien de la référence juridique) is a legal citation guide in Canada. It is published by the McGill Law Journal of the McGill University Faculty of Law and is used by law students, scholars, and lawyers and has been officially adopted by courts and major law reviews throughout Canada. The book is bilingual, one half being in English and the other in French (Manuel canadien de la référence juridique), and is a bijuridical guide to the citation of legal materials.

== Overview ==
The first edition of the McGill Guide was published in 1986. A new edition of the book is released once every four years. While the McGill Guide is the standard citation guide taught at law schools throughout Canada, many jurisdictions have their own unique citation styles.

In contrast to other guides (such as the Bluebook) that are created and published jointly by multiple law reviews, the McGill Guide is primarily written by full-time students on the McGill Law Journal and is published by a separate corporation. The McGill Guide is compiled by the citations editor of the McGill Law Journal and is published by Thomson Reuters (previously Carswell). An online subscription version of the McGill Guide was made available on Westlaw Canada in 2014.

Edition	Year	Citations Editor	Notes
11th edition			The McGill Law Journal has committed to include a method for the citation of the indigenous legal traditions in this edition. This is being done in collaboration with the Indigenous Law Advisory Circle (ILAC).
10th edition	2023	Alexandra Champagne	Foreword by the Honourable Mahmud Jamal
9th edition	2018	Nicolas Labbé-Corbin	Forewords by Patrick Healy and Ian Binnie
8th edition	2014	A. Max Jarvie	Forewords by John Laskin and Nicholas Kasirer Online access to the McGill Guide made available
7th edition	2010	Svetlana Samochkine	Removal of periods in many forms Addition of a Foreign Sources chapter
6th edition	2006	Eliezar I Rosenblatt	
5th edition	2002	Timothy Reibetanz	
4th edition	1998		Guidance on electronic sources and the internet
3rd edition	1992	Lisa Yarmoshuk	
2nd edition	1988	Michael Waterson	Creation of Citations Editor position New chapters on France and the United Kingdom
1st edition	1986		First Canadian guide to uniform legal citation

== Elements ==
The 10th edition of the McGill Guide provides guidance on the style and formatting of the following elements of legal publications:

- Legislation
  - Statutes
  - Constitutional Statutes
  - Codes
  - Bills
  - Regulations
  - Other Information Published in Gazettes
  - Municipal By-laws
  - Rules of Court
  - Securities Commissions
- Jurisprudence
  - Cases with a Neutral Citation
  - Cases without a Neutral Citation
  - Cases in Online Databases
  - Unreported Decisions Without a Neutral Citation
  - Jurisprudence Express
  - Interlocutory Judgments and Motions
  - Administrative Bodies and Tribunals
  - Arguments and Evidentiary Documents
  - Arbitration Cases
- Government Documents
  - Parliamentary Papers
  - Non-parliamentary Documents
    - Tax Interpretation Bulletins (ITs)
    - Information Circulars (ICs)
    - Income Tax Folios
    - Reports of Inquiries and Commissions
    - Public Papers of Intergovernmental Conferences
    - Intergovernmental Documents
      - Indigenous Treaties and Land Claims Agreements
- International Materials
  - International Documents
  - Treaties and Other International Agreements
    - United Nations Documents
    - Council of Europe Documents
    - Organization of American States Documents
    - World Trade Organization (WTO) and the General Agreement of Tariffs and Trade (GATT) Documents
    - Organization for Economic Co-operation and Development (OECD) Documents
  - Cases
    - Permanent Court of International Justice (1922-1946)
    - International Court of Justice (1946–Present)
    - European Court of Human Rights and European Commission of Human Rights
    - Inter-American Commission of Human Rights
    - International Criminal Tribunals
    - International Military Tribunals
    - General Agreement on Tariffs and Trade (GATT) 1947 Panel Reports
    - World Trade Organization (WTO) Panel and Appeallate Body Reports
    - Canada-United States Free Trade Agreement Panels
    - Canada-United States-Mexico Agreement (CUSMA) Binational Panels
    - International Arbitration Cases
    - World Intellectual Property Organization (WIPO) Arbitration Case
    - International Law Cases Decided Before National Courts
- Secondary Sources and Other Materials
  - Journals
  - Books
  - Essays or Entries from Collections of Essays, Dictionaries and Encyclopedias
  - Codes of Professional Conduct
  - Book Reviews
  - Reports
  - Unpublished Manuscripts
  - Addresses and Papers Delivered at Conferences
  - Course Materials
  - Magazines
  - Newspapers, Newswires, and Other News Sources
  - News Releases
  - Personal Communications
  - Archival Materials
  - Working Papers
  - Electric Sources
  - Physical Objects
- Foreign Sources
  - Common Law Jurisdictions
  - Civil Law Jurisdictions
  - United Kingdom
  - United States
  - France
  - Australia
  - New Zealand
  - South Africa
  - European Union
  - Other Legal Traditions
    - Roman Law
    - Canon Law
    - Talmudic Law
    - Islamic Law

== Reception ==
Similar to other uniform legal citation guides (such as the Bluebook), the McGill Guide has been subject to scrutiny by the legal community. One of the most common criticisms is a lack of access to the book due to the price ($89.00), which is sold by Thomson Reuters, rather than directly by the McGill Law Journal. The McGill Law Journal has committed to open access for its journal, but has yet to do so for its citation guide.

== See also ==
- Case citation § Canada
- Citation of Canadian legislation
