= McGill Law Journal =

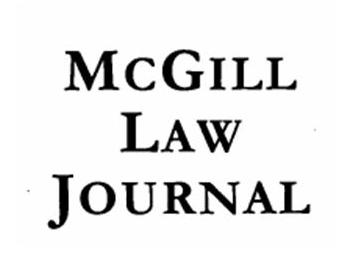
- Language: English, French

Publication details
- History: 1952-present
- Frequency: Quarterly
- Open access: Yes

Standard abbreviations
- Bluebook: McGill L.J.
- ISO 4: McGill Law J.

Indexing
- ISSN: 0024-9041

Links
- Journal homepage

The McGill Law Journal is a student-run legal publication at McGill University Faculty of Law in Montreal, Canada. It is a not-for-profit corporation independent of the Faculty and it is managed exclusively by students. The Journal also publishes the Canadian Guide to Uniform Legal Citation and a series of podcasts since 2012.

A 2022 study assessing the most cited Law Review articles in the history of the Supreme Court of Canada found that the McGill Law Journal was one of a select few elite law journals in Canada and the McGill Law Journal was the most cited by the Supreme Court of Canada with 150 citations, with the second and third place consisting of 100 and 86 citations, respectively.

== Overview ==
Following the faculty's policy of bilingualism, the McGill Law Journal is published in both French and English. The editorial team is therefore composed of both French- and English-speaking students who select and edit articles written in both languages. The Journal publishes texts dealing with different topics in civil law, common law, and Indigenous legal traditions. A member of the legal community wishing to have his or her article published in the Journal can make a submission through the McGill Law Journal website.

== History ==
The McGill Law Journal was founded in 1952 by Gérald Éric Le Dain and Jacques-Yvan Morin, two students at McGill University's Faculty of Law. The Journal was the third entirely student-run journal to appear in Canada. The first issue was edited by the founding editor in chief, Jacques-Yvan Morin. From its inception, the Journal has promoted the development of legal research, attracting a readership of law professors, lawyers, and students. The goal of its founders was to create a forum for intellectual exchange for Quebec's legal community. Because the province is at the crossroads of the two great private law traditions of the Western world, civil law and common law, the first editors of the Journal immediately recognized its potential as a tool for the development of civil law doctrine in English and in French.

== Other Publications and Events ==
=== Canadian Guide to Uniform Legal Citation ===
The first Canadian Guide to Uniform Legal Citation was published by the editors of the McGill Law Journal in 1986. To date, the Guide is in its ninth edition. With the help of members of the legal community—lawyers, judges, librarians, and professors—the Guide evolves with the legal profession. A new edition of the Guide is published every four years.

The Canadian Guide to Uniform Legal Citation provides guidelines on how to build a bibliography and how to reference sources ranging from statutes and case law to Indigenous treaties and Talmudic law. The Guide is a reference standard for many courts and Canadian legal journals. The Guide can be purchased online through the McGill Law Journal website.

=== Podcasts ===
In 2012, the McGill Law Journal started publishing a series of podcasts exploring different aspects of Canadian law, the first Canadian law journal to do so. In the podcast, leading academics, practicing lawyers, or other member of the legal community shed light on contemporary legal issues in conversation with members of the McGill Law Journal.

Recent episodes published by the Journal cover topics such as the legal aspects of climate change, the debate over the notwithstanding clause in Quebec's Act respecting the laicity of the State, and the use of artificial intelligence in the legal field. By examining the legal dimensions of contentious issues, the podcast aims to share legal knowledge and expertise with members of the legal community and of the public.

=== Special Issues ===
Special issues of the McGill Law Journal, which are published about once per volume, are the Journal's way of sharing legal information on a specific issue to a wider audience. Once a topic is chosen, the Journal invites specialists to write about it. Topics ranging from international human rights, contemporary Canadian constitutional law, and reform of the Russian Civil Code have all been selected for special issues. Other topics have included international dispute resolution, the legacy of Roncarelli v. Duplessis, technological innovations and civil liability, and legal pluralism in Indigenous communities.

=== Events organized by the McGill Law Journal ===
The McGill Law Journal organizes several events throughout the year attended by the McGill community and members of the public. These events are designed to promote student involvement and academic research while allowing the Journal to attract high-quality submissions from legal scholars. Each year, an English-language conference and a French-language conference are organized to enlighten the general public on a legal issue. Following each conference, the Journal holds a reception that allows members of the legal community to discuss the topic. The conferences help members of different bar associations obtain professional development credits.

==== The McGill Law Journal's Annual English Lecture ====
Since the early 2000s, the McGill Law Journal has invited a well-known speakers to give a presentation to the McGill legal community and other people residing in Montreal. The lecture is then published in the Journal. The annual English lecture is one of the events at the Faculty of Law. In 1984, Jacques-Yvan Morin gave a presentation there, as did the Honourable Justice Beverly McLachlin in 1991.

==== The McGill Law Journal's Annual French Conference ====
The francophone conference uses the same general concept as its English equivalent, that is, the McGill Law Journal invites a renowned speaker to present on a contested or little-known legal topic to the McGill and broader Montreal legal community. The following chart presents some of the speakers who have been invited to the francophone conference over the years as well as the topics covered in the presentations.

== Past Editors, Members, and Authors ==
=== Former McGill Law Journal Editors ===
Former McGill Law Journal editors include judges Benjamin J. Greenberg, Morris Fish, John Gomery, Jean-Louis Baudouin, Brian Riordan, Allan Lutfy, Suzanne Coupal, Brigitte Gouin, Ronna Brott, Nicholas Kasirer, and Max M. Teitelbaum; there have been some board chairs such as David P. O'Brien and Bernard Amyot; academics such as Dick Pound and Bartha Knoppers; entertainment professionals such as Lionel Chetwynd; and politicians such as Irwin Cotler, Yoine Goldstein, and Canada's Minister of Justice David Lametti.

=== Public Figures who have Published in the Journal ===
Renowned public figures who have appeared in the pages of the Journal include former Canadian Prime Minister Pierre Elliot Trudeau, Supreme Court Justices Rosalie Abella and Gerald Fauteux, former Canadian Governor General David Johnston, and United Nations diplomat Yves Fortier.

== External Publications ==
=== Books ===
In 2013, author James Cummins published The Journal: 60 years of People, Prose, and Publication with 8th House Publishing in Montreal. In celebration of the Faculty of Law's sixtieth anniversary, the book recounts the history of the McGill Law Journal from the first volume to the fifty-seventh.

The Journal also featured in the book A Noble Roster: One Hundred and Fifty Years of Law at McGill, written by a former McGill Law student, Ian C. Pilarczyk.

=== Supreme Court of Canada References to Journal Articles ===
The McGill Law Journal was the first Canadian legal publication to be cited in a Supreme Court decision. To date, the Journal has been cited by the Supreme Court of Canada in over 150 cases.

== See also ==
- McGill Journal of Sustainable Development Law
- Canadian Guide to Uniform Legal Citation
