= Court of Quebec =

Canadian provincial court

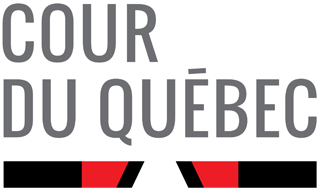
- Established: August 31, 1988
- Website: courduquebec.ca/en/2

Chief Judge
- Currently: Henri Richard
- Since: October 26, 2023

The Court of Quebec (French: Cour du Québec) is a court of first instance in the Province of Quebec, Canada.

The court has jurisdiction over civil matters, criminal and penal matters as well as over youth matters The court sits in administrative matters as well, and in appeal, on cases provided for by the law.

== History ==
The Court of Quebec was created in 1988, when the Provincial Court, the Court of Sessions of the Peace, and the Youth Court were combined into one unified court.

In 2005, as a result of decisions made by higher courts about the status of a "judge with limited jurisdiction," the Courts of Justice Act was amended to allow the appointment of justices of the peace. In addition to the six justices of the peace already in office since June 30, 2004, 27 new justices were appointed in 2005.

In 2013, the Court of Quebec celebrated its 25th anniversary. This event was highlighted in numerous magazines and newspapers including the Journal du Barreau of July and September 2013 and Le Monde juridique (Vol. 21, No. 7, Feb. 4, 2014). Finally, a motion to mark this event was adopted unanimously by the National Assembly of Quebec on September 25, 2013.

== Composition ==
=== Judges in management positions ===
The Court of Quebec is made up of 333 judges and 39 presiding justices of the peace. The court has a management structure that assists the judges in the performance of their duties and functions. The Courts of Justice Act provides for the positions of chief judge, senior associate chief judge, and associate chief judges, whose mandates last seven years and cannot be renewed. The coordinating judges and associate coordinating judges complete this structure. Their mandates span a maximum of three years and can be renewed.

The chief judge and senior associate chief judge are the president and vice-president respectively of the Judicial Council of Quebec (Conseil de la magistrature du Québec). The associate chief judges are also members.

Current chief judges team
Function	Name	Term of office
Chief Judge	Henri Richard	October 26, 2023 –
Senior Associate Chief Judge	Benoit Sabourin	February 1, 2024 –
Associate Chief Judge for the Civil Division	Martin Tétreault	May 29, 2024 –
Associate Chief Judge for the Criminal and Penal Division	Marco LaBrie	November 29, 2023 –
Associate Chief Judge for the Youth Division	Mélanie Roy	February 1, 2024 –

== Chief judge ==
The chief judge ensures the general policies of the court are followed, coordinates and distributes the judges' work, promotes their professional development, and ensures compliance with the Judicial Code of Ethics.

The chief judge is supported in her work by the team of judges in management positions. The chief judge represents the Court of Quebec and acts as its spokesperson with the government and other stake holders in the judicial system.

Chief judges from the establishment of the Court of Quebec in 1988
Name	Term of office
Henri Richard	October 26, 2023 –
Lucie Rondeau	October 26, 2016 to October 25, 2023
Élizabeth Corte	October 21, 2009 to October 20, 2016
Guy Gagnon	September 24, 2003 to September 26, 2009
Huguette St-Louis	August 28, 1996 to September 23, 2003
Louis-Charles Fournier	September 1, 1995 to August 28, 1996
Albert Gobeil	August 31, 1988 to August 31, 1995

== Associate chief judges ==
The four associate chief judges advise the chief judge in matters for which they are responsible. They help the court achieve its objectives and establish its priorities and policies by recommending ways to improve its operations. They also support and assist judges with their daily tasks. At the request of the chief judge, the associate chief judges chair committees formed to select candidates for the position of judge.

The associate chief judge responsible for the municipal courts performs the duties and functions conferred under the Act respecting municipal courts. In collaboration with the municipal judges, he drafts general policies for them and monitors compliance. In addition, he ensures that judicial ethics are observed and oversees the professional development of the municipal judges. The municipal judges under his jurisdiction work in nearly 90 local and regional municipal courts serving nearly 900 municipalities across Quebec.

== Coordinating and associate coordinating judges ==
With the government's approval, the chief judge designates a coordinating judge from among the court's judges for each of the court's ten coordinating regions. She can also designate a maximum of 12 associate coordinating judges. These judges represent the Court of Quebec in dealings with various parties in their respective regions. They help develop the court's priorities, policies, and practices, based in part on regional judges' expertise and the specific needs of their regions.

The coordinating and associate coordinating judges are also tasked with welcoming new judges. They are responsible for regional professional development programs.

=== Judges ===
The 333 Court of Quebec judges hear and decide cases involving civil, administrative and appellate, criminal and penal, and youth matters. Some judges hear cases involving only one of these matters, while others—particularly in the regions—hear cases in more than one division or area.

=== Per diem judges ===
Some sixty per diem judges (i.e., retired judges who are authorized to exercise the judicial functions assigned to them by the chief judge) serve the Court on an ad hoc basis to assist it in fulfilling its mission. Per diem judges make a valuable contribution by helping the Court to minimize judicial delays.

== Coordinating Regions ==
To make it easier to coordinate the court's activities, its territory is divided into 10 regions:

- Abitibi-Témiscamingue–Eeyou Istchee–Nunavik
- Bas-Saint-Laurent–Côte-Nord–Gaspésie–Îles-de-la-Madeleine
- Estrie
- Laval–Laurentides–Lanaudière–Labelle
- Mauricie–Bois-Francs–Centre-du-Québec
- Montérégie
- Montreal
- Outaouais
- Québec–Chaudière-Appalaches
- Saguenay–Lac-Saint-Jean

Judges also carry out their duties on a circuit court to serve Indigenous communities in northern Quebec and the Côte-Nord region.

== See also ==
- Law in Quebec
