= Climate Law and Governance Initiative =

International consortium

Climate Law and Governance Initiative (CLGI)
- Founded: 2014; 12 years ago
- Founder: World Future Council, Centre for International Sustainable Development Law
- Purpose: Humanitarian
- Region served: Worldwide
- Key people: Marie-Claire Cordonier Segger, Ayman Cherkaoui
- Website: www.climatelawgovernance.org

The Climate Law and Governance Initiative is an international consortium of partners in the climate law community working to build capacity and knowledge relating to law and governance approaches to address climate change. Ongoing research projects carried out by its partner institutions support the hosting of events and specialized capacity-building workshops in parallel with the annual climate negotiations under the UNFCCC. The initiative's focus is the effective implementation of SDG 13 on Climate Change. Its events are officially endorsed by the UNFCCC.

== Events ==
Founded in 2014 and launched in the lead-up to the COP21 negotiations in Paris, CLGI has roots in a range of events, conferences and workshops dating back to the first meeting of the Kyoto Protocol (COP11/CMP1) in Montreal, 2005. Events over the preceding decade laid the groundwork for the Initiative.

=== Climate Law and Governance Day 2015 ===
The Inaugural Climate Law and Governance Day (CLGD) was held in December 2015 at Université Paris 1 Panthéon-Sorbonne, bringing together climate advocates, scholars and practitioners to discuss the roles that law and governance play in climate-change efforts. Key participants were John H. Knox, Mary Robinson, Bianca Jagger and Bradnee Chambers, with Marie-Claire Cordonier Segger as chair. Its goal was to create a community of practice to support global climate efforts.

=== Climate Law and Governance Day 2016 ===
The second CLGD was held at Université Privée de Marrakech in November 2016, and explored the development of the Paris Rulebook (later named the Paris Agreement Work Program, and agreed at COP24). Discussions focused on how domestic climate instruments could be crafted, modalities to mobilize climate finance, equity issues, and trends in climate litigation. Its outcomes were shared with delegates to COP22 in an official side event focused on climate-vulnerable countries. COP22 also saw the first full-day climate law specialization course to further empower delegates to utilize law and governance solutions to combat climate change.

=== Climate Law and Governance Day 2017 ===
Held at University of Bonn, the third CLGD was opened by Hon Aiyaz Sayed-Khaiyum and centered on advancing law and governance contributions to global climate action. Key themes were how innovation could support the achievement of Nationally Determined Contributions (NDCs) under the Paris Agreement; the implementation of climate obligations; advancing climate resilience; and enabling climate finance. Its sessions were informed by a pre-COP event in Fiji in preparation for COP23. CLGI was an officially endorsed event of the COP23 Presidency. The second one-day specialization course was held in conjunction with United Nations University.

=== Climate Law and Governance Day 2018 ===
CLGD 2018 was held during COP24 at the University Silesia, Katowice, Poland, in December 2018. Discussions centered on the sharing of national experiences and best practices, knowledge exchange, and building a community of practice to support global capacity-building efforts. The day's programs were developed through a round table at the preceding intersessional meeting. Key participants included Christian Voigt, and Kamil Wyszkowski, President of The Global Compact Network for Poland.

== Partners ==
=== Core partners ===
- Lauterpacht Centre for International Law
- Global Open Data for Agriculture and Nutrition
- Centre for International Governance Innovation
- Centre for International Sustainable Development Law

=== Intergovernmental organizations ===
- International Union for Conservation of Nature World Commission on Environmental Law (WCEL)
- United Nations Environment Programme Division of Environmental Law and Conventions (DELC)
- International Development Law Organization
- Center for International Forestry Research
- World Bank Division on Law, Justice and Development
- European Bank for Reconstruction and Development
- United Nations Development Programme

=== Academic institutions ===
- University of the South Pacific
- Universidade Eduardo Mondlane
- United Nations University
- University of Bonn
- Université Paris 1 Panthéon-Sorbonne
- Cambridge University
- Columbia Law School
- Université Cadi Ayyad (UCA)
- Université Privée de Marrakech
- Yale University
- University of Chile
- Université de Kinshasa
- University of Toronto
- Université Hassan 1er de Settat
- Ateneo de Manila University

=== Law firms and associations ===
- International Law Association
- International Bar Association
- Baker McKenzie
