= Valentina Durán Medina =

Jurist in environmental law

- Born: Chile
- Education: BLSc Universidad de Chile; DEA Paris I Panteón-Sorbonne

Valentina Alejandra Durán Medina is an international jurist in environmental and climate change law, and both a Professor of Law at Universidad de Chile and Director of the Centre for Environmental Law (CDA). In addition to coordinating the Clinic of Environmental Law and Conflict Resolution, Durán is Lead Counsel for Peace, Justice and Governance at the Centre for International Sustainable Development Law.

== Education ==
Durán completed her undergraduate studies at the Universidad de Chile obtaining a Bachelors of Legal and Social Sciences in 1994 and is a licensed attorney in Chile. Later Durán obtained a Diplôme d'études approfondies (DEA) from Paris I Panteón-Sorbonne.

== Professional career ==
Durán began her academic tenure as a Professor at the Universidad de Chile in 2000. In 2017 she was appointed as Director of the Centre for Environmental Law (CDA). Valentina Durán is also professor at the Environmental Law Clinic of the same Faculty Clinical Department. She is also Lead Counsel for Peace, Justice and Governance at the Centre for International Sustainable Development Law.

Durán was the Legal manager of a consulting firm Gestión de la calidad ambiental (GESCAM), and is member of the board of Comunidad Mujer. She was also the Director of the Association of Women Lawyers of Chile (Asociación de Abogadas de Chile) and is member of the board of think tank Espacio Publico.

Durán was also a member of the Lithium Commission of the Ministry of Mining in 2014.

== Publications ==
Representative publications include:

- Principles of inter-generational equity, public participation and good governance in the Inter American Development Bank's oversight mechanism in Marie-Claire Cordonier Segger, HE Judge Christopher Weeramantry eds., Sustainable Development in International Courts and Tribunals (Routledge, 2017), with Alexandra Harrington.
- A Legal View on Border Tax Adjustments and Climate Change: A Latin American Perspective (Sustainable Development Law & Policy 11:3, 2011), with Rodrigo Polanco Lazo.
