= Voices of Future Generations for the Middle East Region =

Writing Initiative

Voices of Future Generations for the Middle East Region (VoFG Arabia)
- Founder: World Future Council, Centre for International Sustainable Development Law
- Leader: Jennifer Malton
- Key people: Sheikha Hissa bint Hamdan bin Rashid Al Maktoum
- Website: https://vofg.vofgarabia.org/

Voices of Future Generations for the Middle East Region (VoFG Arabia, Arabic: أصوات أجيال المستقبل) is a writing initiative that promotes sustainability and the United Nations convention on the Rights of the Child. Sheikha Hissa Hamdan bin Rashid Al Maktoum is the Goodwill Ambassador of this initiative. In 2014, VoFG was launched internationally, whereas the launch of the Voices of Future Generations for the Middle East region was in 2019. The initiative organizes a writing competition for students aging between 8 and 12 years, which encourages young writers to incorporate the Sustainable Development Goals and the United Nations convention on the Rights of the Child into their stories.

== Child Author and Ambassador ==
=== Ambassador ===
The Voices of Future Generations (VoFG) programme, under the patronage of UNESCO, appointed Sheikah Hissa bint Hamdan bin Rashid Al Maktoum as a Goodwill Ambassador for the Gulf Region. Whereas the Emirates Literature Foundation confirmed as consultants for the project for the next five years.

=== Child Authors ===
==== Round 1 Winners ====
Sources:

==== English ====
- Saira Thomas (First Place)
- Sashini Manikandan (Second Place)
- Shahid Fayis (Third Place)
- Hazza Mohamed Rashed Al Ameri
- Meghna Senthil Kumar
- Ioana Teodorova Stefanova
- Abrar Ahmed Sirohey
- Mir Faraz
- Aditi Gandhi
- Joshua Melwin

==== Arabic ====
- Saoud Ahmad Salem Alkabi (First Place)
- Abdulkarim Ghazal (Second Place)
- Ahmed Ismail Zindah (Third Place)
- Nour Ahmed Alkhatib
- Ward Wissam AlHalabi
- Al Yaziah Salah Al Din Khamis Hilal Al Kaabi
- Matra Ibrahim Salem Fairouz
- Aamna Hamad Salem Obaid Saif Al Suwaidi
- Lama Ehab Almousa
- Suhaila Abdelhaleem Mansour

==== Round 2 Winners ====
Sources:

==== English ====
- Abrar Ahmed Sirohey (First Place)
- Kripa Dixit (Second Place)
- Inayah Fathima Faeez (Third Place)
- Diniru Sathnidu Dissanayake
- Mirana Gabin Mathew
- Danial Petric
- Mara Machado-Mullet
- Jaivardhan Manish Nawani
- Shaivi Kalwani
- Ethan Dsouza
- Advay Saravana Kumar

==== Arabic ====
- Abdulla Ismail Abushabab (First Place)
- Seba Awadh Mohammed Almusad (Second Place)
- Mezna Najeeb (Third Place)
- Hassan Nidal Hassam Awad
- Hazza Ali Salem Mohamed Al Yileili
- Mariam Eslam Mostafa Kandiel
- Abdullah Mohammad Abdullah Alrabab'ah
- Maktom Salim Khamis Salim Almazrouei
- Aamna Hamad Salem Obaid Saif Al Suwaidi
- Salim Ahmed Salim Alkaabi
- Hania Asaad Sherif

==== Round 3 Winners ====
Sources:

- Inayah Faeez
- Inaya Danish Zaidi
- Mohammed Siddiqui
- Nourah Alnaqbi
- Rodina Badr
- AbdulKareem Ghazal
- Shaurya Chakravarty
- Mariam Kandiel
- Chris Stanley
- Aisha AlKhayyal
- Alex Abernethy
- Hamad Alblooshi
- Sana Priyadharshini
- Zein Al Jundi
- Advika Gupta
- Khalid Alnaqbi
- Siddharth Vachali
- Mohamed Alzeyoudi
- Sanvika Sandeep
- Tala Alhajeh
- Sadeen AlAqra

==== Round 4 Winners ====
- Mir Faraz
- Siddhant Seth
- Shravni Nethra
- Eishaal Rashid
- Sophie Claire Dias
- Alishbah Umar Khan
- Hamdan Taha Noor
- Lucia De Quesada Martin
- Tinveer Naidoo
- Nishuka Mahith Balasuriya
- Diala Sadeq Khatib
- Lemar Walid Al-Zrekat
- Jana Osama Mahfouz Tahami
- Judi Mohammed Jamal Abdul Hamid Mahmoud
- Shahad Hassan Al-Eid Al-Suwaidan
- Mohammed Abdulla Mohammed Almazrouei
- Seilina Raafat Hamed
- Khaloud Marwan Saleh Mohammed
- Budoor Abullah Abbod BinSaad
- Shama Mubarak Slayem Mubarak Alkhyeli
- Yahya Alaa Gharib Abdalla

=== Round 5 Winners ===
- Lujain Wissam Al Halabi
- Assil Hassan Abdelnabi Ibrahim Mohamed
- Aisha Humaid Obaid Al Khayyal
- Mohammed Hamdan Siddiqui
- Jenine El Azzami
- Rayshal Tharun Harshal
- Hamza Mohamed Ramadan Ghobashi Abdelaziz
- Avika Singh
- Hamza Noor Aldeen Alhaj Ali
- Zakaria Yahya Takriti
- Khadija Saeed Sulaiman Alhassani
- Anirudh Ganesh
- Shahad Hasan Al Swidan
- Nuha Danish
- Reham Ahmed Shafeeg Ahmed
- Arya Sharma
- Meera Hamdan Alabdouli
- Madiha Javed
- Saif Ahmed Salim alkaabi
- Myra Jaju
- Yassin Mohamed Kamel Haroun
- Kyler Dias

== Illustrators ==
=== Round 1 ===
- Haifa Malhas
- Aisha Hilal
- Alya Abdelrahim AlHamadi
- Ari Puguh
- Asma Enayeh
- Asmaa Alhosan
- Aysha Al Hamrani
- Dina Fawakhiri
- Khadija Al Saeedi
- Khulood Ghuloom Aljana
- Nouf Alismail
- Sanaa Al Maktoum
- Sarah Mohamed Hammad
- Stacey Siebritz
- Sura Ghazwan
- Abdul Jabbar
- Tarfa Khalid
- Tasneem Amiruddin
- Wafa Ibrahim

=== Round 2 ===
- Tarfa Khalid
- Ari Puguh
- Alya Abdelrahim AlHamadi
- Asmaa Alhosani
- Khadija Al Saeedi
- Sanaa Al Maktoum
- Khulood Ghuloom Aljanahi
- Sarah Mohamed Hammad
- Tasneem Amiruddin
- Sura Ghazwan Abdul Jabbar
- Stacey Siebritz
- Aisha Hilal
- Aysha Al Hamrani
- Dina Fawakhiri
- Ayesha Almheiri
- Maryah Al Rashed
- Zainab Khaleel
- Basma Hosam
- Maitha Al Khayat
- Noha Gmal
- Marion Battaglia
- Esraa Magdy Gaber

=== Round 3 ===
- Khadija Alsaeedi
- Aysha Al Hamrani
- Zainab Khaleel
- Basma Hosam
- Sarah Mohamed Hammad
- Marion Battaglia
- Tasneem Amiruddin
- Noha Atta
- Basma Hosam
- Ari Puguh
- Sura Ghazwan
- Sadie Sulaiman
- Alia Al Hammadi
- Fatima Raza
- Stacey Siebritz
- Wafa Ibrahim Rashid Ali
- Dina Fawakhiri
- Khalid Mezaina
- Nivea Serrao
- Khulood Ghuloom Mohammed Hassan Aljanaahi
- Maryah Al Rashed

=== Round 4 ===
- Khadija Al Saeedi
- Esraa Magdy Gaber
- Marion Battaglia
- Asma Enayeh
- Stacey Siebritz
- Arkiel Brown
- Zainab Khaleel
- Shielvy Salazar
- Nivea Serrao
- Aisha Hilal
- Ari Puguh
- Khalid Mezaina
- Noha Gmal Mahmod Atta
- Basma Hosam
- Maryah Al Rashed
- Aysha Saif Al Hamrani
- Alia Al Hammadi
- Tasneem Amiruddin
- Sarah Mohamed Hammad
- Fatima Raza
- Khulood Ghuloom Mohammed Hassan Aljanaahi
- Wafa Ibrahim Rashid Ali
- Sura Ghazwan

=== Round 5 ===
- Dina Fawakhiri
- Neelofar Rafique Ahmed
- Noha Gmal Mahmod Atta
- Marion Battaglia
- Maryah Al Rashed
- Basma Hosam
- Zainab Khaleel
- Noni Tahir
- Khadija Al Saeedi
- Nivea Serrao
- Zarifi Haidar
- Arkiel Brown
- Karine Jabel
- Esraa Magdy Jaber
- Nour Altouba
- Sohila Khaled
- Khalid Mezaina
- Dina Fawakhiri
- Aysha Saif Al Hamrani
- Nour Altouba
- Sohila Khaled
- Sura Ghazwan

== Publications ==
- Young Voices of Arabia (the 2020 collection), the Emirates literature Foundation, 2020 (EN) (ISBN 978-9948-8591-2-3)
- Young Voices of Arabia (the 2020 collection) (original title: أصوات شابة من شبه الجزيرة العربية), the Emirates Literature Foundation, 2020 (ISBN 978-9948-8591-1-6)
- Young Voices of Arabic (the 2021 collection), ELF Publishing, 2021 (EN) (ISBN 978-9948-8842-1-7)
- Young Voices of Arabic (the 2022 collection), ELF Publishing, 2022 (EN) (ISBN 9789948800965)
- Young Voices of Arabic (the 2024 collection), ElF Publishing, 2024 (EN) (ISBN 9789948 718079), (Ar) (ISBN 9789948 718888)
