= Bill Clarke (politician) =

Canadian politician (1933–2025)

Member of Parliament for Vancouver Quadra
- In office January 4, 1973 – July 9, 1984
- Preceded by: Grant Deachman
- Succeeded by: John Turner

Personal details
- Born: William Hillary Clarke; July 5, 1933 Toronto, Ontario, Canada
- Died: December 26, 2025 (aged 92) Vancouver, British Columbia, Canada
- Party: Progressive Conservative Party of Canada
- Other political affiliations: Conservative Party of British Columbia
- Education: University of British Columbia

William Hillary Clarke (July 5, 1933 – December 26, 2025) was a Canadian chartered accountant, businessman, and politician. Clarke served as a Progressive Conservative member of the House of Commons of Canada.

== Early life and career ==
Clarke attended schools in Toronto's Forest Hill district, then studied at Ridley College at St. Catharines and St. George's School in Vancouver. His post-secondary education was at the University of British Columbia. He became a chartered accountant for Price Waterhouse's Vancouver office in 1956.

== Political career ==
Clarke entered national politics in the 1972 Canadian federal election, in which he ran successfully to become the Member of Parliament for the riding of Vancouver Quadra. Clarke defeated Liberal MP Grant Deachman by under 3,000 votes. Clarke was re-elected at the riding in the 1974, 1979 and 1980 federal elections. Clarke therefore served four consecutive terms, from the 29th through 32nd Canadian Parliaments.

In the 1984 federal election, Clarke lost his seat to Prime Minister John Turner, who had become leader of the Liberal Party while out of Parliament earlier that year. Clarke was defeated even as his party won the most seats in Canadian history, and he was one of only two Tory MPs to lose a re-election bid in 1984. (John A. Gamble of York North was the other; he lost to Tony Roman as his far-right political beliefs came under scrutiny.) Clarke made two further unsuccessful attempts to regain Vancouver Quadra as a PC candidate: in 1988, coming second to Turner, and 2000, coming third behind Stephen Owen.

He was the Conservative Party of British Columbia's candidate for the riding of Vancouver-Quilchena in the 2013 British Columbia general election but due to a clerical error he was unaffiliated on the ballot. He came in fourth place, with BC Liberal candidate Andrew Wilkinson winning.

Clarke was the most recent non-Liberal member of parliament for Vancouver Quadra.

== Later life and death ==
Clarke later resided in the Kerrisdale neighbourhood in Vancouver. Clarke died on December 26, 2025 in Vancouver, British Columbia, at the age of 92.

== Electoral record ==
=== Federal ===
2000 Canadian federal election: Vancouver Quadra
| Party | Candidate | Votes | % | ±% | Expenditures |
|---|---|---|---|---|---|
| Liberal | Stephen Owen | 22,253 | 44.84 | +2.69 | $60,542 |
| Alliance | Kerry-Lynne Findlay | 18,613 | 37.50 | +9.91 | $64,240 |
| Progressive Conservative | Bill Clarke | 4,112 | 8.28 | –8.59 | $12,355 |
| New Democratic | Loretta Woodcock | 2,595 | 5.23 | –4.80 | $10,844 |
| Green | Doug Warkentin | 1,434 | 2.89 | +0.31 | $16,556 |
| Canadian Action | Chris Shaw | 390 | 0.79 | – | $5,683 |
| Natural Law | Steven R. Beck | 126 | 0.25 | –0.22 | none listed |
| Marxist–Leninist | Anne Jamieson | 109 | 0.22 | –0.08 | $18 |
| Total valid votes | | 49,632 | 99.61 | | |
| Total rejected ballots | | 194 | 0.39 | –0.06 | |
| Turnout | | 49,826 | 63.34 | –4.42 | |
| Eligible voters | | 78,664 | | | |
| Liberal hold | | Swing | | –3.61 | |
Change for the Canadian Alliance is based on the Reform Party.
Source: Elections Canada

1988 Canadian federal election: Vancouver Quadra
| Party | Candidate | Votes | % | ±% |
|---|---|---|---|---|
| Liberal | John Turner | 24,021 | 43.95 | +0.02 |
| Progressive Conservative | Bill Clarke | 16,664 | 30.49 | –6.97 |
| New Democratic | Gerry Scott | 11,687 | 21.38 | +4.56 |
| Reform | J.R. Jack Ford | 1,112 | 2.03 | – |
| Rhinoceros | John Turner | 760 | 1.39 | +0.95 |
| Libertarian | Walter Boytinck | 129 | 0.24 | +0.06 |
| Communist | Bert Ogden | 75 | 0.14 | – |
| Independent | Albert A. Ritchie | 74 | 0.14 | – |
| Independent | Blair Longley | 52 | 0.10 | – |
| Confederation of Regions | Nora Galenzoski | 35 | 0.06 | – |
| Commonwealth of Canada | J.G. Joseph Jackman | 23 | 0.04 | +0.00 |
| Independent | Allen H. Soroka | 22 | 0.04 | – |
| Total valid votes | | 54,654 | 99.36 | |
| Total rejected ballots | | 353 | 0.64 | +0.20 |
| Turnout | | 55,007 | 80.15 | –5.18 |
| Eligible voters | | 68,631 | | |
| Liberal hold | | Swing | | +3.50 |
Source: Elections Canada

1984 Canadian federal election: Vancouver Quadra
| Party | Candidate | Votes | % | ±% |
|---|---|---|---|---|
| Liberal | John Turner | 21,794 | 43.94 | +13.23 |
| Progressive Conservative | Bill Clarke | 18,581 | 37.46 | –8.63 |
| New Democratic | Ray Cantillon | 8,343 | 16.82 | –4.93 |
| Green | Jim Bohlen | 389 | 0.78 | – |
| Rhinoceros | Ian McConkey | 219 | 0.44 | –0.45 |
| Independent | Diane Jones | 111 | 0.22 | – |
| Libertarian | Marco Den Ouden | 87 | 0.18 | – |
| Independent | Bill Burgess | 28 | 0.06 | –0.16 |
| Independent | David Michael Shebib | 20 | 0.04 | – |
| Commonwealth of Canada | T. Gaetan Feuille D'érable Wall | 20 | 0.04 | – |
| Independent | J.G. Joseph Jackman | 12 | 0.02 | – |
| Total valid votes | | 49,604 | 99.56 | |
| Total rejected ballots | | 220 | 0.44 | +0.16 |
| Turnout | | 49,824 | 85.33 | +13.07 |
| Eligible voters | | 58,392 | | |
| Liberal gain from Progressive Conservative | | Swing | | +10.93 |
Source: Elections Canada

1980 Canadian federal election: Vancouver Quadra
| Party | Candidate | Votes | % | ±% |
|---|---|---|---|---|
| Progressive Conservative | Bill Clarke | 20,993 | 46.09 | +0.52 |
| Liberal | Peter Pearse | 13,987 | 30.71 | +1.31 |
| New Democratic | Alan Bush | 9,907 | 21.75 | –2.71 |
| Rhinoceros | Verne John Eh McDonald | 405 | 0.89 | – |
| Social Credit | Elaine Wanstall | 104 | 0.23 | – |
| Independent | Peter Rabbit Milne | 73 | 0.16 | – |
| Marxist–Leninist | Allen H. Soroka | 50 | 0.11 | –0.04 |
| Independent | Byron Nelson | 26 | 0.06 | – |
| Total valid votes | | 45,545 | 99.72 | |
| Total rejected ballots | | 127 | 0.28 | –0.26 |
| Turnout | | 45,672 | 72.26 | –5.55 |
| Eligible voters | | 63,206 | | |
| Progressive Conservative hold | | Swing | | +0.40 |
Source: Elections Canada

1979 Canadian federal election: Vancouver Quadra
| Party | Candidate | Votes | % | ±% |
|---|---|---|---|---|
| Progressive Conservative | Bill Clarke | 19,869 | 45.57 | –2.69 |
| Liberal | Paul Manning | 12,820 | 29.40 | –10.09 |
| New Democratic | Alan Bush | 10,665 | 24.46 | +13.13 |
| Libertarian | Campbell Osborne | 144 | 0.33 | – |
| Marxist–Leninist | David Fuller | 64 | 0.15 | –0.16 |
| Independent | Fred Gilbertson | 37 | 0.08 | – |
| Total valid votes | | 43,599 | 99.46 | |
| Total rejected ballots | | 236 | 0.54 | +0.20 |
| Turnout | | 43,835 | 77.81 | –1.23 |
| Eligible voters | | 56,336 | | |
| Progressive Conservative hold | | Swing | | +3.70 |
Source: Elections Canada

1974 Canadian federal election: Vancouver Quadra
| Party | Candidate | Votes | % | ±% |
|---|---|---|---|---|
| Progressive Conservative | Bill Clarke | 18,892 | 48.26 | +5.69 |
| Liberal | Frank Low-Beer | 15,458 | 39.49 | +3.55 |
| New Democratic | Nigel Nixon | 4,434 | 11.33 | –8.82 |
| Social Credit | Edith Garner | 179 | 0.46 | –0.45 |
| Marxist–Leninist | Brian Sproule | 120 | 0.31 | – |
| Independent | Norman G. Dent | 61 | 0.16 | – |
| Total valid votes | | 39,144 | 99.66 | |
| Total rejected ballots | | 133 | 0.34 | –0.41 |
| Turnout | | 39,277 | 79.04 | –2.42 |
| Eligible voters | | 49,692 | | |
| Progressive Conservative hold | | Swing | | +1.07 |
Source: Library of Parliament

1972 Canadian federal election: Vancouver Quadra
| Party | Candidate | Votes | % | ±% |
|---|---|---|---|---|
| Progressive Conservative | Bill Clarke | 17,767 | 42.57 | +12.27 |
| Liberal | Grant Deachman | 15,001 | 35.94 | –18.34 |
| New Democratic | Nigel Nixon | 8,411 | 20.15 | +5.20 |
| Social Credit | Edith Garner | 378 | 0.91 | – |
| Independent | Rupert Beebe | 180 | 0.43 | – |
| Total valid votes | | 41,737 | 99.25 | |
| Total rejected ballots | | 316 | 0.75 | +0.26 |
| Turnout | | 42,053 | 81.46 | +0.24 |
| Eligible voters | | 51,621 | | |
| Progressive Conservative gain from Liberal | | Swing | | +15.30 |
Source: Library of Parliament

1972 Canadian federal election: Vancouver Quadra
| Party | Candidate | Votes | % | ±% |
|---|---|---|---|---|
| Progressive Conservative | Bill Clarke | 17,767 | 42.57 | +12.27 |
| Liberal | Grant Deachman | 15,001 | 35.94 | –18.34 |
| New Democratic | Nigel Nixon | 8,411 | 20.15 | +5.20 |
| Social Credit | Edith Garner | 378 | 0.91 | – |
| Independent | Rupert Beebe | 180 | 0.43 | – |
| Total valid votes | | 41,737 | 99.25 | |
| Total rejected ballots | | 316 | 0.75 | +0.26 |
| Turnout | | 42,053 | 81.46 | +0.24 |
| Eligible voters | | 51,621 | | |
| Progressive Conservative gain from Liberal | | Swing | | +15.30 |
Source: Library of Parliament

=== Provincial ===
2013 British Columbia general election: Vancouver-Quilchena
| Party | Candidate | Votes | % | ±% | Expenditures |
|---|---|---|---|---|---|
| Liberal | Andrew Wilkinson | 14,496 | 64.32 | −5.91 | $99,877 |
| New Democratic | Nicholas Scapillati | 5,705 | 25.31 | +4.57 | $30,366 |
| Green | Damian Kettlewell | 1,667 | 7.40 | −1.64 | $2,267 |
| No Affiliation | Bill Clarke | 671 | 2.98 | – | $14,738 |
| Total valid votes | | 22,539 | 99.52 | – | |
| Total rejected ballots | | 108 | 0.48 | −0.09 | |
| Turnout | | 22,647 | 59.45 | +1.78 | |
| Registered voters | | 38,095 | | | |
| Liberal hold | | Swing | | -5.24 | |
Source: Elections BC

== Archives ==
There is a Bill Clarke fonds at Library and Archives Canada. Archival reference number is R3730.
