= Ashfaq Khalfan =

Human rights activist

Amnesty International Director, Law and Policy Programme

Personal details
- Born: Kenya
- Education: McGill University (BA, LLB); University of Oxford (DPhil)

Ashfaq Khalfan is an international jurist in human rights law, Director of the Law and Policy Programme at Amnesty International, and chair of the Board of Governors of the Centre for International Sustainable Development Law.

== Education ==
Khalfan completed his undergraduate studies at McGill University, in Montreal and continued on to complete a Bachelor of Civil Law/Bachelor of Laws. Following his studies at McGill, he received a DPhil from Exeter College, Oxford.

== Professional career ==
Khalfan started as an Economic, Social and Cultural Rights Policy Coordinator with Amnesty International in 2009 and late became a researcher and advisor for the Obligations Beyond Borders Project in 2014. In 2015, Khalfan was appointed Director of the Law and Policy Programme. Previously, Khalfan directed the Right to Water Programme at the Centre on Housing Rights and Evictions and acted as a consultant for the Office of the United Nations High Commissioner for Human Rights, and Deutsche Gesellschaft für Internationale Zusammenarbeit (GIZ).

From 2000 to 2010, Khalfan was Director of the Centre for International Sustainable Development Law.

Much of Khalfan's research focuses on issues related to adequate access to clean water and sanitation, and advancing social justice.

== Publications ==
Khalfan has contributed to nearly 20 books, articles, and reports. Representative publications include:

- Accountability Mechanisms in Malcolm Langford, Wouter Vandenhole, Martin Scheinin and Willem van Genugten, eds., Global Justice, State Duties: The Extraterritorial Scope of Economic, Social, and Cultural Rights in International Law (Cambridge University Press, 2013).
- Commentary to the Maastricht. Principles on Extraterritorial Obligations of States in the Area of Economic, Social and Cultural Rights Human Rights Quarterly, Vol. 34, No. 4 (Nov. 2012), with Olivier De Schutter, Asbjørn Eide, Marcos Orellana, Margot Salomon and Ian Seiderman.
- From Promises To Delivery: Putting Human Rights At The Heart Of The Millennium Development Goals (Amnesty International, 2010).
- Manual on the Right to Water and Sanitation (SDC, AAAS, UN-HABITAT and COHRE, 2008)
- Sustainable Development Law: Principles, Practices and Prospects (Oxford University Press, 2004), with Marie-Claire Cordonier Segger.
