= Results of the 1968 Canadian federal election =

1968 Canadian federal election

== Results by Province and Territory ==
=== Alberta ===
Results in Alberta
Party	Seats	Second	Third	Fourth	Fifth	Sixth	Votes	%	+/-
Progressive Conservative	15	4	1				287,572	51	
Liberals	4	14	1				201,045	35.66	
NDP		1	13	5			52,720	9.35	
Social Credit			3				10,934	1.94	
Independent Liberal			1		1	1	8,599	1.53	
Independent Progressive Conservative				1			1,349	0.24	
Independent				1			1,206	0.21	
Communist				1			410	0.07	
Total	19						563,835	100.0	

=== British Columbia ===
Results in British Columbia
Party	Seats	Second	Third	Fourth	Fifth	Votes	%	+/-
Liberals	16	7				333,949	41.77	
NDP	7	7	9			260,989	32.64	
Progressive Conservative		8	13	1		151,033	18.89	
Social Credit		1	1	18		50,821	6.36	
Communist					4	1,196	0.15	
Independent				1	1	928	0.12	
Reform Party of Canada				1		420	0.05	
Republican				1		175	0.02	
Total	23					799,511	100.0	

=== Manitoba ===
Results in Manitoba
Party	Seats	Second	Third	Fourth	Fifth	Votes	%	+/-
Liberals	5	8				166,025	41.47	
Progressive Conservative	5	4	4			125,713	31.4	
NDP	3	1	8	1		99,977	24.97	
Social Credit			1	4		5,973	1.49	
Independent				1	1	1,207	0.3	
Communist				1		869	0.22	
Independent Conservative				1		632	0.16	
Total	13					400,396	100.0	

=== New Brunswick ===
Results in New Brunswick
Party	Seats	Second	Third	Fourth	Votes	%	+/-
Progressive Conservative	5	5			125,269	49.71	
Liberals	5	5			111,843	44.39	
NDP			9	1	12,277	4.87	
Ralliement créditiste			1		1,769	0.7	
Independent				1	553	0.22	
Independent Progressive Conservative				1	268	0.11	
Total	10				251,979	100.0	

=== Newfoundland and Labrador ===
Results in Newfoundland and Labrador
Party	Seats	Second	Third	Fourth	Votes	%	+/-
Progressive Conservative	6	1			84,483	52.74	
Liberals	1	6			68,549	42.79	
NDP			7		7,042	4.4	
Social Credit				1	126	0.08	
Total	7				160,200	100.0	

=== Northwest Territories ===
Results in Northwest Territories
Party	Seats	Second	Third	Votes	%	+/-
Liberals	1			6,018	63.8	
Progressive Conservative		1		2,211	23.44	
NDP			1	1,203	12.75	
Total	1			9,432	100.0	

=== Nova Scotia ===
Results in Nova Scotia
Party	Seats	Second	Third	Fourth	Votes	%	+/-
Progressive Conservative	10	1			186,026	55.21	
Liberals	1	10			127,962	37.98	
NDP			11		22,676	6.73	
Independent Progressive Conservative				1	293	0.09	
Total	11				336,957	100.0	

=== Ontario ===
Results in Ontario
Party	Seats	Second	Third	Fourth	Fifth	Votes	%	+/-
Liberals	63	22	1			1,362,759	46.22	
Progressive Conservative	17	40	30			942,979	31.98	
NDP	6	26	56			607,011	20.59	
Independent	1			5	1	18,419	0.62	
Liberal-Labour	1					10,144	0.34	
Independent Liberal				3		3,714	0.13	
Communist				4	2	1,568	0.05	
Social Credit				3		888	0.03	
Independent Progressive Conservative				1		571	0.02	
Socialist Labour				1		202	0.01	
New Canada Party					1	148	0.01	
National Socialist				1		89	0	
Total	88					2,948,492	100.0	

=== Prince Edward Island ===
Results in Prince Edward Island
Party	Seats	Second	Third	Votes	%	+/-
Progressive Conservative	4			26,276	51.76	
Liberals		4		22,854	45.02	
NDP			4	1,636	3.22	
Total	4			50,766	100.0	

=== Quebec ===
Results in Quebec
Party	Seats	Second	Third	Fourth	Fifth	Sixth	Seventh	Votes	%	+/-
Liberals	56	18						1,170,417	53.58	
Progressive Conservative	4	37	31	2				466,492	21.36	
Ralliement créditiste	14	10	17	23	7			358,635	16.42	
NDP		7	25	40	1			164,466	7.53	
Independent		2		2	6	4	1	13,541	0.62	
Independent Liberal			1	1	2	1		4,472	0.2	
Parti de la Démocratisation Économique					5			2,651	0.12	
Franc Lib				1				2,141	0.1	
Rhinoceros					1			354	0.02	
Conservative					1			339	0.02	
Esprit Social						1		311	0.01	
Independent Progressive Conservative						1		281	0.01	
Communist					1			192	0.01	
Total	74							2,184,292	100.0	

=== Saskatchewan ===
Results in Saskatchewan
Party	Seats	Second	Third	Fourth	Votes	%	+/-
Progressive Conservative	5	7	1		153,233	36.97	
NDP	6	6	1		147,941	35.7	
Liberals	2		11		112,332	27.11	
Independent				1	689	0.17	
Communist				1	230	0.06	
Total	13				414,425	100.0	

=== Yukon ===
Results in Yukon
Party	Seats	Second	Third	Votes	%	+/-
Progressive Conservative	1			3,110	47.97	
Liberals		1		3,048	47.02	
NDP			1	325	5.01	
Total	1			6,483	100.0	
