= Grant Deachman =

Canadian politician

- Official 1968 portrait

Member of Parliament for Vancouver Quadra
- In office May 16, 1963 – September 1, 1972
- Preceded by: Howard Charles Green
- Succeeded by: Bill Clarke

Personal details
- Born: May 4, 1913 Calgary, Alberta
- Died: June 24, 1983 (aged 70)
- Party: Liberal Party of Canada

Grant Deachman (May 4, 1913 – June 24, 1983) was a Canadian politician, who represented the electoral district of Vancouver Quadra in the House of Commons of Canada from 1963 to 1972.

He was a member of the Liberal Party and served as Chief Government Whip from 1971 to 1972.

== Election results ==
1972 Canadian federal election: Vancouver Quadra
Party	Candidate	Votes	%	±%
Progressive Conservative	Bill Clarke	17,767	42.57	+12.27
Liberal	Grant Deachman	15,001	35.94	-18.34
New Democratic	Nigel Nixon	8,411	20.15	+5.20
Social Credit	Edith Garner	378	0.91	–
Independent	Rupert Beebe	180	0.43	–
Total valid votes		41,737	100.0	
Progressive Conservative gain from Liberal		Swing		+15.30

1968 Canadian federal election: Vancouver Quadra
Party	Candidate	Votes	%	±%
Liberal	Grant Deachman	20,788	54.29	+15.45
Progressive Conservative	John A. Pearkes	11,604	30.30	-7.49
New Democratic	George Trasov	5,727	14.96	-1.13
Republican	Robert Hein	175	0.46	–
Total valid votes		38,294	100.0	
Liberal hold		Swing		+11.47

1965 Canadian federal election: Vancouver Quadra
Party	Candidate	Votes	%	±%
Liberal	Grant Deachman	12,895	38.84	-2.90
Progressive Conservative	Howard Charles Green	12,549	37.80	-0.07
New Democratic	George E. Trasov	5,342	16.09	+1.43
Social Credit	Donald W. Gosse	2,416	7.28	+1.54
Total valid votes		33,202	100.0	
Liberal hold		Swing		-1.42

1963 Canadian federal election: Vancouver Quadra
Party	Candidate	Votes	%	±%
Liberal	Grant Deachman	15,160	41.73	+10.66
Progressive Conservative	Howard Charles Green	13,756	37.87	-7.59
New Democratic	Dorothy Gretchen Steeves	5,324	14.66	-2.49
Social Credit	James P.R. Mason	2,085	5.74	-0.59
Total valid votes		36,325	100.0	
Liberal gain from Progressive Conservative		Swing		+9.12

1962 Canadian federal election: Vancouver Quadra
Party	Candidate	Votes	%	±%
Progressive Conservative	Howard Charles Green	15,113	45.46	-25.26
Liberal	Grant Deachman	10,331	31.07	+14.79
New Democratic	Philip H. Waddell	5,699	17.14	+7.17
Social Credit	Emil Peter Schafer	2,103	6.33	+3.30
Total valid votes		33,246	100.0	
Progressive Conservative hold		Swing		-20.02
Change for the New Democrats is based on the Co-operative Commonwealth.

== Archives ==
There is a Grant Deachman fonds at Library and Archives Canada. Archival reference number is R11992.
