= Alexandra Harrington =

- Born: United States
- Education: Emma Willard School: BA New York University; JD Albany Law School; LLM Albany Law School; DCL McGill University Faculty of Law
- Awards: Fulbright Canada Research Chair in Global Governance, 2018-2019

Alexandra Harrington is an international jurist in human rights, environmental and climate change law, and both a Professor of Law at Albany Law School and Assistant Director of the Global Institute for Health and Human Rights. In addition, Harrington is Director of Studies for the International Law Association of Colombia, a member of the ILA Committee on the Role of International Law in Sustainable Natural Resource Management for Development, and is Lead Counsel for Peace, Justice and Governance at the Centre for International Sustainable Development Law.

== Education ==
Harrington completed her undergraduate studies at New York University, moving on to complete both a Juris Doctor and a Master of Law from Albany Law School, and a Doctor of Civil Law from McGill University Faculty of Law.

== Professional career ==
Harrington began her academic tenure as an associate professor at Albany Law School in 2011. Harrington is an adjunct professor in the Faculty of Law, as well as an affiliated faculty and assistant director of the Global Institute for Health and Human Rights.

In addition to being director of studies for the International Law Association of Colombia and a member (affiliate) of the International Law Association Committee on the Role of International Law in Sustainable Natural Resource Management for Development, Harrington is an expert for the International Centre for Trade and Sustainable Development, and has previously consulted for the Commission for Environmental Cooperation of the North American Agreement on Environmental Cooperation.

Harrington also serves as Lead Counsel for Peace, Justice and Governance at the Centre for International Sustainable Development Law and is a member of the board of governors.

In 2018 Harrington was awarded Fulbright Canada Research Chair in Global Governance, conducting her research on the role of treaty regimes in global governance at the Balsillie School of International Affairs in Waterloo, Canada.

Harrington also hosted a multilateral environmental agreements (MEAs) bootcamp organized by the Youth Plastic Action Network and the Children and Youth Major Group (CYMG) in 2025, which trained over 2,000 individuals on the workings of UN environmental processes.

== Publications ==
Harrington has edited or contributed to over 40 peer-reviewed publications and policy reports. Representative publications include:

- International Organizations and the Law (Routledge, 2018)
- A Complex System of International Courts and Tribunals in Marie-Claire Cordonier Segger, HE Judge Christopher Weeramantry eds.,Sustainable Development in International Courts and Tribunals (Routledge, 2017), with Cairo Robb.
- The Crime of Aggression and New Environmental and Socio-Economic Harms in Sébastien Jodoin, Marie-Claire Cordonier Segger, eds., Sustainable Development, International Criminal Justice, and Treaty Implementation (Cambridge University Press, 2013).
- Climate Change and Sustainable Energy Measures in Regional Trade Agreements (RTAs): An Overview (ICTSD, Issue Paper No.3 2013), with Markus W. Gehring, Marie-Claire Cordonier Segger, Fabiano de Andrade Correa, Patrick Reynaud, and Rodrigo Mella
- Harrington, Alexandra R. (2005) "Courthouses, Bookshelves, and Portals: The Implications of U.S. v. American Library Association on First Amendment Forum Analysis and Future Internet-Based Litigation Strategies," Oklahoma Journal of Law and Technology: Vol. 2 : No. 1, Article 14.
