= Voices of Future Generations =

Initiative to aid young advocates for children's rights

Voices of Future Generations (VoFG)
- Founded: 2014; 12 years ago
- Founder: World Future Council, Centre for International Sustainable Development Law
- Purpose: Humanitarian
- Region served: Worldwide
- Key people: Dr Odette Lara, Programme Manager
- Website: www.vofg.org

The Voices of Future Generations (VoFG) Initiative (founded in 2014) was launched on the 25th Anniversary of the United Nations Convention on the Rights of the Child by a consortium of partners including World Future Council, Centre for International Sustainable Development Law, the Office of the Commissioner for Fundamental Rights in the Government of Hungary, and the Trust for Sustainable Living, with the support of the United Nations Educational, Scientific and Cultural Organization.

The mission of the VoFG Initiative is to aid children in advancing the rights to education, literacy, and a clean environment in accordance with the United Nations Sustainable Development Goals (SDG). Through a book series, stories relating to the environment authored by children (8-12) from around the globe are professionally illustrated, published, and disseminated to elementary schools internationally to support literacy. All of the books are available to download free of charge in English, French and Spanish. Hardcopy books are available with proceeds going to international literacy efforts.

== Child Authors and Ambassadors ==
=== Child Authors ===
Child authors (ages 8–12) are selected through a global competitive process with the aim for global representation. The current child authors:

- Adelyn Sophie, from the First Nations (Canada)
- Jasper Chin Moody, from Oceania
- Rehema Kibugi, from Nairobi, Republic of Kenya in Africa
- Andrea Wilson, from North America
- Christina-Angelina Kassongo, from the République Démocratique du Congo, Africa
- Tyronah Sioni, from Papua New Guinea
- Meng-Xin, from Taiwan
- Allison Lievano-Gomez, from Mexico

=== Ambassadors ===
Child Ambassadors for the SDGs work to raise awareness of sustainable development issues within their respective region and participate in international fora to provide a voice for future generations. The current Child Ambassadors for the SDGs are:

- Nico Roman (Europe and North America)
- Bella Morrisseau Whiskeyjack (Indigenous)
- Enzo Manuel (the Pacific Islands)
- Wazi Chilubanama (Africa)
- Sydnee Wynter (Indigenous)
- Anisa Daniel-Oniko (Africa)

=== Alumni ===
Alumni of the VoFG Initiative are:

- Jona David, from Europe and North America
- Ying-Xuan Lai, from Taiwan
- Lupe Va'ai, from Samoa
- Lautaro Real, from Uruguay
- Diwa Boateng, from South Africa
- Anna Kuo, from Taiwan
- Kehkashan Basu, from the United Arab Emirates

== VoFG Policy Input ==
Child Authors engage in discussions relating to the SDGs in relevant international fora providing perspectives of future generations to support global policymaking. In 2015 two child authors, Jona David and Allison Lievano Gomez, delivered speeches to the United Nations General Assembly during the High-Level Event on Climate Action and Youth. In addition, child authors met with UNESCO Director-General Irina Bokova to highlighting the Initiative and delivering the Children's Declaration on the World's Sustainable Development Goals. The Declaration incorporated the views of 2700 children representing 70 nations and encourages more effective engagement with youth in global policy development relating to the SDGs.

== Publications in English ==
- Voices of the Future: Stories from Around the World (2018) An anthology of stories from the VoFG Initiative produced in conjunction with UNESCO. Includes a Teaching Guide for use in the classroom.
- The Tree of Hope by Kehkashan Basu, illustrated by Karen Webb-Meek (2017).
- The Epic Eco-Inventions by Jona David, illustrated by Carol Adlam (2017).
- The Fireflies After the Typhoon by Anna Kuo, illustrated by Siri Vinter (2017).
- The Forward and Backward City by Diwa Boateng, illustrated by Meryl Treatner (2017).
- The Sisters’ Mind Connection by Allison Lievano-Gomez (Latin America), illustrated by Oscar Pinto (2017).
- The Voice of an Island by Lupe Vaai, illustrated by Li-Wen Chu (2017).
- The Visible Girls by Tyronah Sioni, illustrated by Kasia Nieżywińska (2017).
- The Great Green Vine Invention by Jona David, illustrated by Carol Adlam (2017).
- The Mechanical Chess Invention by Jona David, illustrated by Dan Ungureanu (2017).
- A Path to Life by Ying-Xuan Lai, illustrated by Kasia Nieżywińska (2018).
- The Cosmic Climate Invention by Jona David, illustrated by Dan Ungureanu (2018).
- The Sound of Silence by Ying-Xuan Lai, illustrated by Kasia Nieżywińska (2019).
- The White Dolphin by Meng-Xin, illustrated by Li-Wen Chu (2019).
- The Small Sparrow Hero by Huang Yun-Hung, illustrated by Celia Tian (2019).
- Journey for Tomorrow by Andrea Wilson (North America) illustrated by Vikki Zhang (2020).
- The Children Who Saved the Mangroves by Rehema Kibugi (Africa) illustrated by Justine Greenfield (2021).

== Publications in Spanish ==
- El árbol de la esperanza by Kehkashan Basu, illustrated by Karen Webb-Meek, translated by Karen Mariel and Odeeth Lara (2018).
- Los magnifícos eco-inventos by Jona David, illustrated by Carol Adlam, translated by Odeeth Lara and Rodrigo Mella (2017).
- Las luciérnagas después del tifón by Anna Kuo, illustrated by Siri Vinter, translated by Karen Mariel and Odeeth Lara (2018).
- La ciudad al derecho y al revés by Diwa Boateng, illustrated by Meryl Treatner, translated by Yedid Guerrero and Karen Mariel (2018).
- La conexión mental entre las hermanas by Allison Lievano-Gomez (Latin America), illustrated by Oscar Pinto (2017).
- The Voice of an Island by Lupe Vaai, illustrated by Li-Wen Chu, translated by Odeeth Lara and Magdalena Padilla (2017).
- Las niñas visibles by Tyronah Sioni, illustrated by Kasia Nieżywińska, translated by Melissa Reynoso and Odeeth Lara (2018).
- La invención del gran viñedo verde by Jona David, illustrated by Carol Adlam, translated by Victoria Lara and Cecilia Sustaita (2018).
- La invención del ajedrez mecánico by Jona David, illustrated by Dan Ungureanu, translated by Victoria Lara and Cecilia Sustaita (2018).
- Un camino a la vida by Ying-Xuan Lai, illustrated by Kasia Nieżywińska, translated by Victoria Lara and Cecilia Sustaita (2020).

== Publications in French ==
- L’arbre de l’espoir by Kehkashan Basu, illustrated by Karen Webb-Meek, translated by Laurance Masing and Gabriel McNulty (2019).
- Les éco-inventions épiques by Jona David, illustrated by Carol Adlam, translated by Beatrice Cordonier, Ayman Cherkaoui and Caroline Chung (2018).
- Les lucioles après le typhon by Anna Kuo, illustrated by Siri Vinter, translated by Agathe de Broucker and Gabriel McNulty (2020).
- La ville : un pas en avant, un pas en arrière by Diwa Boateng, illustrated by Meryl Treatner, translated by Agathe de Broucker and Gabriel McNulty (2020).
- La connexion mentale des deux sœurs by Allison Lievano-Gomez (Latin America), illustrated by Oscar Pinto, translated by Annick Eisele and Caroline Chung (2018).
- La voix de son île by Lupe Vaai, illustrated by Li-Wen Chu, translated by Laurance Masing and Gabriel McNulty (2019).
- Les filles visibles by Tyronah Sioni, illustrated by Kasia Nieżywińska, translated by Annick Eisele and Caroline Chung (2019).
- La grande vigne verte by Jona David, illustrated by Carol Adlam, translated by Justine Gonthier and Catherine Grammond (2018).
- L’invention d’échecs mécaniques by Jona David, illustrated by Dan Ungureanu, translated by Agathe de Broucker and Gabriel McNulty (2020).
- Un chemin vers la vie by Ying-Xuan Lai, illustrated by Kasia Nieżywińska, translated by Gabriel McNulty (2020).

== International Commission ==
The VoFG Initiative has an International Commission for advisory. Current members of the International Commission are:

- Marie-Claire Cordonier Segger
- Alexandra Wandel
- Prof. Kirsten Sandberg
- Julia Marton-Lefevre
- Prof. Marcel Szabo
