= British Columbia Ombudsperson =

Canadian ombudsman office

The Office of the British Columbia Ombudsperson is one of ten provincial ombudsman offices in Canada. It receives enquiries and complaints about the administrative practices and services of public agencies in British Columbia. It is headed by the B.C. Ombudsperson, an officer of the provincial legislature who is independent of government and political parties. Its role is to impartially investigate complaints to determine whether public agencies have acted fairly and reasonably, and whether their actions and decisions were consistent with relevant legislation, policies and procedures.

== History ==
Following the ombudsperson model which originated in Sweden in 1809, the Office of the Ombudsperson, British Columbia, was established in 1970.

The first ombudsperson in British Columbia was Karl Friedmann (1979–1985). He was succeeded by Peter Bazowski (Acting Ombudsman 1985–1986), Stephen Owen (1986–1992), Dulcie McCallum (1992–1999), Brent Parfitt (Acting Ombudsman 1999 and 2006), Howard Kushner (1999–2006), Kim Carter (2006–2015), Jay Chalke (2015–2026), and Sandy Hermiston (2026 to present).

As ombudsperson, Carter introduced an early resolution program to improve the timeliness of resolutions for individuals and authorities. She has also established a systemic investigation team that has produced a number of public reports on areas ranging from lottery prize security to home and community care programs for seniors.

Under Chalke’s leadership, the Office of the Ombudsperson carried out a number of systemic investigations, including the Fairness in a Changing Climate report examining government disaster supports, the A Bid for Fairness and Working Within the Rules reports highlighting how rigid or outdated government practices can disproportionately harm vulnerable British Columbians, and a series of reports that strengthened protections for people in provincial custody. Chalke also oversaw the implementation of new responsibilities for the Ombudsperson under B.C.’s Public Interest Disclosure Act, which provides secure channels for public employees to report serious workplace wrongdoing.

In the 2024/25 fiscal year, the Ombudsperson's office received 7,307 inquiries and complaints under the Ombudsperson Act and 303 inquiries, advice requests, and disclosure reports under the Public Interest Disclosure Act.

== Role and mandate ==
The BC Ombudsperson operates under the authority of the BC Ombudsperson Act, and can investigate complaints of unfair treatment by more than 2,000 public agencies in British Columbia in the process of implementing government policies. Before registering a complaint, people who contact the Ombudsperson's Office are first referred to specific agencies' internal resolution procedures, if they haven't already tried this route.

The office responds to complaints from individuals and organizations, and also initiates systemic investigations. Confidential interpretation services are offered in more than 180 languages and written information about the Ombudsperson's Office is available in English, French, Chinese, Filipino, Korean, Punjabi, Vietnamese and Spanish.

The office also makes recommendations about improvement in administrative processes, so that the same problems do not recur. For example, In September 2013, the office produced a 'preventative ombudship' report, Open Meetings: Best Practices Guide for Local Governments. In February 2013, the office produced a report that made recommendations for improvement to practices followed by the Public Guardian and Trustee and the six health authorities, establishing provincial training for staff, and creating legally binding minimum requirements when creating certificates of incapability. In 2014, the office released recommendations for improvement in environmental oversight by the Ministry of Forests, Lands and Natural Resources of land development.

The office brings issues to public awareness, and also reports directly to the British Columbia Legislature. An ombudsperson's recommendations are usually very specific suggestions for legislative, regulatory or procedural changes. In 2012 the office issued its largest report called The Best of Care: Getting it Right for Seniors in British Columbia, Part 2, making recommendations to the Ministry of Health and five health authorities about improving home and community care, home support, assisted living and residential care services for seniors.

Agencies that are under the ombudsperson jurisdiction include all provincial ministries, Crown corporations, boards and commissions (e.g. WorkSafeBC). Municipalities, regional districts, schools and boards of education, as well as health authorities and hospitals, and also self-regulating professions, such as the College of Physicians and Surgeons, the Law Society, College of Social Workers, are all included.

== Current officeholder ==
Sandy Hermiston was appointed Ombudsperson in November 2025. Her present six-year term as Ombudsperson started January 31, 2026.

Beginning in 2014, Sandy served as General Counsel to the Ombudsman and Public Interest Commissioner in Alberta. From there, she was appointed as the first Ombudsman of the Cayman Islands in 2017, where she was responsible for consolidating the existing Office of the Information Commissioner and Office of the Complaints Commissioner.

In February 2022, Sandy was appointed the first Ombudsperson and Public Interest Disclosure Commissioner for Prince Edward Island.

Sandy is co-course director at Osgoode Hall Law School’s Professional Development Certificate in Advanced Issues in Ombuds Practice. She is also a regular speaker at national conferences for ombuds practice.

In her private life, Sandy spent twenty years volunteering with parasport organizations provincially, nationally and internationally. She received volunteer recognition from Sport Alberta in 2017 and was inducted into the Canadian Cerebral Palsy Sports Association’s Hall of Fame as a builder in 2022.

== Reports and publications ==
The Office of the BC Ombudsperson has created both annual and investigation-specific reports, which are publicly available on its website.
