= Marie-Claire Cordonier Segger =

British lawyer and professor

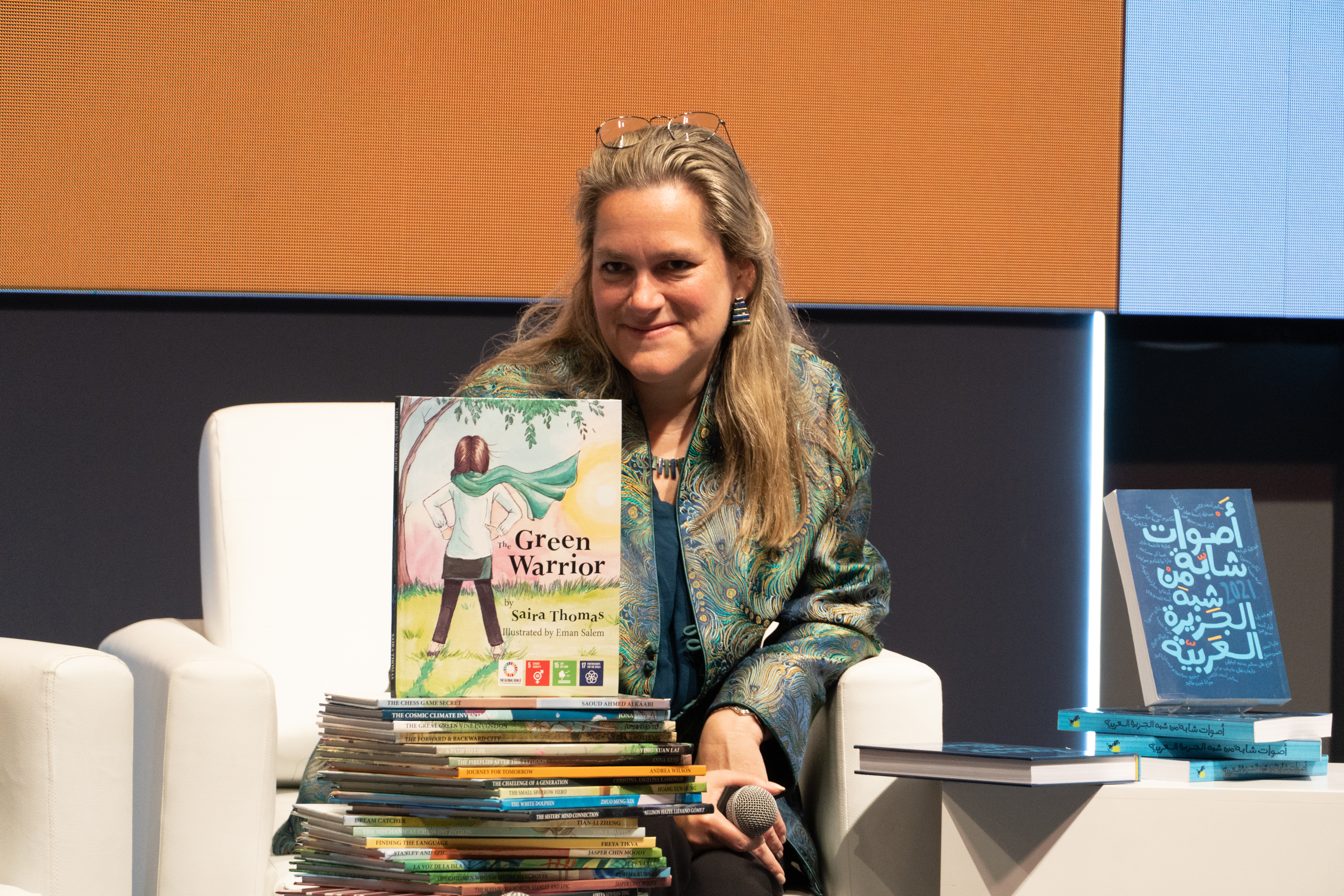
- Born: United Kingdom
- Education: BA Hons University of Victoria & Carleton University; BCL/LLB McGill University Faculty of Law; MEM Yale University; DPhil University of Oxford; PhD University of Cambridge
- Spouse: Markus Gehring
- Awards: UNFCCC High-Level Champions Climate Impact Maker, 2024 Weeramantry International Justice Award, 2020 Leverhulme Trust Visiting Professorship Award, 2019 Justitia Regnorum Fundamentum Award, 2016

Marie-Claire Cordonier Segger FRSC FRSA WIJA is a professor of sustainable development law and governance and international law. She is an international jurist widely recognised as a founding figure in sustainable development law, an emerging field of legal and policy research, study and practice on sustainable development.

She holds the world's first Chair in Sustainable Development Law and Policy at the University of Cambridge in Lucy Cavendish College and serves as Fellow of the Royal Society of Canada (FRSC) in the Academy of Social Sciences and Fellow of the Royal Society of Arts (FRSA) in the United Kingdom. She is also a Fellow in Law & LLM/MCL Director of Studies at the Lucy Cavendish College; fellow at the Lauterpacht Centre for International Law; member of the Bennett School of Public Policy and fellow of the Cambridge Centre for Energy, Environment & Natural Resource Governance.

She serves as executive secretary of the Climate Law and Governance Initiative (CLGI) under the United Nations Framework Convention on Climate Change (UNFCCC) and holds adjunct professorships at the University of Victoria Faculty of Law and the University of Waterloo School of Environment, Enterprise and Development, where she is also senior fellow at the Balsillie School of International Affairs. She also serves as chair of the Convention on Biological Diversity (CBD) Biodiversity Law & Governance Initiative; and chairs the International Law Association Committee on International Law for the SDGs; co-founder of the Sustainable Development Solutions Network (SDSN) of Canada; Vice President of the International Law Association (ILA) of Canada; co-founder and councillor of the World Future Council.

In 2002, Cordonier Segger co-founded the Centre for International Sustainable Development Law (CISDL), creating the first international law centre dedicated to integrating human rights, environmental, and economic rules to promote development that can last over the long term. Cordonier Segger authored the foundational textbook Sustainable Development Law: Principles, Practices and Prospects (Oxford University Press, 2004) with Dr Ashfaq Khalfan, which established sustainable development law as a distinct legal discipline. The second considerably expanded edition was published in 2025, with Professor Damilola Sunday Olawuyi. Her scholarly, educational, and institutional contributions have been instrumental in shaping international legal frameworks on climate change, biodiversity, trade and investment, natural resources, and the Sustainable Development Goals.

== Education and Early life ==
=== Youth Leadership ===
After moving from the UK and Switzerland to Canada as a child, Cordonier Segger became active in environmental and human rights advocacy during the late 1980s as a youth leader in British Columbia (BC), Canada. As founder and president of Victoria Environmental Youth Alliance, a leader in the Environmental Youth Alliance and co-founder of the BC Environment Network youth caucus, from the age of fourteen she led sustainability education and awareness efforts, standing up for future generations in youth workshops and conferences on biodiversity, climate change and sustainable stewardship of forests and other natural resources, volunteering with scientists in the Pacific Forestry Research Centre of Canada, and coordinating campaigns for the protection of the west coast ancient temperate rainforests, including through partnerships with Indigenous leaders and direct action. Committed to social justice and international development, she also served as founder and president of her school Amnesty human rights club, on the council of the Amnesty International Youth Campus Network and as a youth organiser for the Victoria International Development Education Association (VIDEA), co-hosted a youth radio show on social justice, and coordinated eco-education summer camps for local children during this period. In 1991, she led a network of youth from over a dozen schools in a series of actions, including a five-day fast for future forests, which combined with many efforts resulted in the launch of a new Commission on Resources and Environment (CORE) land use planning process in which youth were formally represented, Forest Practices Code, and Protected Areas Strategy creating 147 new parks which doubled the protected area of BC. In 1993, defending the reforms, she led a youth hunger strike that continued until the government agreed not to weaken the new Forest Practices Code, and to respect their Protected Areas Strategy.

Her youth leadership and engagement in international law on sustainability began with her mentor, Canadian sustainable development visionary and business leader Maurice Strong, in the 1991 negotiations of the UN Framework Convention on Climate Change (UNFCCC), UN Convention on Biological Diversity (CBD) and UN Convention to Combat Desertification and Drought (UNCCD), when her Environmental Youth Alliance took up the challenge to co-host, together with a Costa Rican youth organisation, the Youth ’92 world preparatory conference for the 1992 United Nations ‘Earth Summit’ Conference on Environment and Development in Rio de Janeiro. For this commitment, she travelled the coast of the Americas continent, a year-long voyage along the Caratela Panamericana speaking to youth, indigenous leaders and communities about sustainability challenges and opportunities from Canada to Costa Rica to Chile then across to Brazil. Reaching Rio in 1992, she served as a youth delegate to the 1992 UN Earth Summit, where the UNFCCC and CBD were signed alongside a UN Declaration on Forests, and later also supported the UNCCD’s entry into force. Returning to Canada, she founded the West Coast Environmental Youth Alliance for the Americas, hosting further international conferences in Ecuador and Costa Rica and serving as guest lecturer for the United World College of the Pacific. She co-led the founding of a Canadian Environmental Network youth caucus, also undertaking further youth biodiversity and climate change projects, and serving as national coordinator of the Youth for Habitat II process, which facilitated youth engagement in the 2nd UN Conference on Human Settlements (UNCHS) in Istanbul Turkiye in 1996. She founded and represented a national Youth Sustainability Project (YSP), co-leading the international youth presence in the 1997 Earth Summit+5 in Rio, and the UN General Assembly Special Session on Sustainable Development (UNGASS) at UN Headquarters in New York City, and co-led the Green Fire youth leadership conference in Nairobi, key steps in the formation of youth major groups for the UN Environment Assembly (UNEA), UNFCCC and CBD regimes. Years later, as an international lawyer and head of the International Development Law Organization (IDLO) delegation to the UNFCCC COP19 in Warsaw, she undertook a ten-day hunger strike to raise awareness about climate justice challenges together with other 1992 Earth Summit former youth leaders who – now leaders in their countries – had called for support.

=== Education ===
Cordonier Segger began her undergraduate studies at the University of Victoria, completing three years before transferring to Carleton University, where she graduated in 1997 with a Bachelor of Arts with highest honours in Interdisciplinary Studies. She pursued her legal education at McGill University Faculty of Law, completing both a Bachelor of Civil Law (BCL) and a Bachelor of Laws (LLB) degrees with distinction and several awards in 2002, during which she spent an exchange year as an LLM student in the London School of Economics and School of Oriental and African Studies.

She continued her studies at Yale University, where she completed a Master of Environmental Management (MEM) with specialisation in Environmental Economics, Law and Policy on scholarship, graduating with full honours in 2003. At the University of Oxford, she completed a DPhil in International Law in Exeter College under the supervision of Professor Vaughan Lowe, Chichele Professor of Law at All Souls College, in 2012. As a Chevening Scholar and a Reader in the All Souls Codrington Library, supported by doctoral award from Canada's Social Sciences and Humanities Research Council (SSHRC), her thesis analysed the sustainable development provisions in over two hundred international trade and investment treaties. In 2023, the University of Cambridge, Lucy Cavendish College, awarded her a second PhD ad eundem gradum for her international law scholarship and leadership. Fluent in English, French, Spanish, she also speaks basic German and Portuguese, with notions of Italian and Mohawk.

== Professional career ==
Cordonier Segger began her professional career as National Director of the Youth Sustainability Project during the UN General Assembly Special Session on Sustainable Development in 1997, then as manager and senior advisor for the International Institute for Sustainable Development, in partnership with the United Nations Environment Programme. She also served as an advisor for the North American Commission for Environmental Cooperation, associate fellow at Chatham House (Royal Institute of International Affairs) and teaching fellow at Yale University. In 2002, she co-founded and became Director, then Senior Director of the Centre for International Sustainable Development Law, based at McGill University in Montreal, Canada, serving as Executive Secretary of the UNFCCC COP Climate Law & Governance Initiative from 2005, Chair of the CBD COP Biodiversity Law and Governance Initiative from 2010, and Vice Chair of the Voices of Future Generations Children's Rights Initiative. In addition, she became a member of both the Canadian Bar Association and International Law Association of Canada, which she serves as Vice President. Cordonier Segger also served as a course development expert and instructor for the National Judicial Institute of Canada and as seminar and lecture series coordinator for the Faculty of Law at Oxford University.

After her doctoral studies, Cordonier Segger joined the Government of Canada as assistant director in Sustainable Development and International Affairs, also serving as a/director general at Natural Resources Canada, while also serving as international professor in the Faculty of Law at the University of Chile. On Executive Interchange, she became the inaugural senior director of research for the Sustainable Prosperity Institute at the University of Ottawa. In 2010, on leave from the Government of Canada, she joined the International Development Law Organization, and became head of the Sustainable Economic Development division, directing their signature Legal Preparedness for Climate Change Initiative and their Legal Preparedness for Achieving the Aichi Biodiversity Targets Initiative. As IDLO senior legal expert, she contributed to the drafting of the global Sustainable Development Goals. During this period, she also served as general counsel in the secretariat for the Ramsar Convention on Wetlands of International Importance and international professor in the Faculty of Natural Resources and Faculty of Law at the University of Kisangani, Democratic Republic of Congo.

In 2015, Cordonier Segger was appointed senior legal advisor to the Presidency of the Conference of the parties to the UNFCCC and then became a senior legal advisor to the Climate Vulnerable Countries. In 2016, the Office of the Commissioner for Fundamental Rights in the Government of Hungary awarded her the Justitia Regnorum Fundamentum Award. She returned to the Government of Canada to lead the Governance and Stakeholder Relations in the renewed Environment and Climate Change Canada. She was also appointed full professor of law (part-time) in the School of Environment, Enterprise & Development (SEED), University of Waterloo, Canada.

In 2019, Cordonier Segger was awarded a senior Leverhulme Trust Visiting Professorship in the University of Cambridge, also joining Lucy Cavendish College as Fellow in Law and LLM/MCL director of studies, and began lecturing in the Faculty of Law and what became the Bennett School for Public Policy. In 2020, Cordonier Segger was named an inaugural laureate of the Weeramantry International Justice Award. In 2022, she was appointed to the inaugural Chair in Sustainable Development Law and Policy in Lucy Cavendish College, as part-time director of the Democratising Education for Global Sustainability and Justice Programme (DemEd Global), providing online educational opportunities for current and future law and policy leaders in over 120 climate vulnerable countries and beyond; she was also elected Fellow of the Royal Society of Canada (FRSC) in the Academy of Social Sciences, one of Canada's highest scholarly honours. She co-received the Climate Law and Governance Global Leadership Award at UNFCCC COP27 in 2023, and in 2025 was named UNFCCC High-Level Champions Climate Impact Maker for her leadership in shaping global climate law.

== Awards ==
- UNFCCC High-Level Champions Climate Impact Maker (2024)
- Weeramantry International Justice Award (2020)
- Leverhulme Trust Visiting Professorship Award (2019)
- Justitia Fundamentum Regnorum (2016)

== Publications ==
Cordonier Segger has edited or authored over 29 books and authored over 180 peer-reviewed papers in six languages. Representative publications include:

- Indigenous Peoples Inspiring Sustainable Development: Implementing UNDRIP through International Law and Covenants, ed. with W. Garnons-Williams (Cambridge University Press, 2026)
- Sustainable Development Law: Principles, Practices and Prospects, 2nd edition, with Damilola S. Olawuyi (Oxford University Press, 2025)
- Routledge Handbook of Climate Law and Governance: Courage, Contributions and Compliance, editor with C. Voigt (Routledge, 2024)
- CITES as a Tool for Sustainable Development, ed. with D.A. Wardell (Cambridge University Press, 2023)
- Athena's Treaties: Crafting Trade and Investment Accords for Sustainable Development (Oxford University Press, published 2021).
- Implementing International Law through Domestic Institutions for Inter-Generational Justice (Cambridge University Press, published 2020), with Marcel Szabo and Alexandra Harrington.
- Sustainable Development in International Courts and Tribunals (Routledge, published 2017), ed. with HE Judge Christopher Weeramantry.
- Sustainable Development, International Criminal Justice, and Treaty Implementation (Cambridge University Press, 2013) with Sébastien Jodoin.
- Legal Aspects of Implementing the Cartagena Protocol on Biosafety (Cambridge University Press, 2013), ed, with F. Perron-Welch, and C. Frison.
- Sustainable Development in World Investment Law (Kluwer Law International, 2010), editor with Markus Gehring and Andrew Newcombe.
- World Trade Law in Practice (Globe Business Publishers, 2006).
- Beyond the Barricades: The Americas Trade and Sustainable Development Agenda (Ashgate Publishing, 2005) contributor with Maria Leichner Reynal.
- Sustainable Development Law: Principles, Practices and Prospects (Oxford University Press, 2004), with Ashfaq Khalfan.
- Sustainable Justice: Integrating Environmental, Social and Economic Law (Martinus Nijhoff, 2004), editor with HE Judge Christopher Weeramantry.
- Weaving the Rules for Our Common Future(CISDL, 2002), with Ashfaq Khalfan and S. Nakhjavan.
- Trade Rules and Sustainability in the Americas (International Institute for Sustainable Development, 1999).
- War No More: Poetry in Hope of Peace (Morris, 1992), with D Mittler.
