= Howard Charles Green =

Canadian politician

The Honourable Howard Charles Green PC
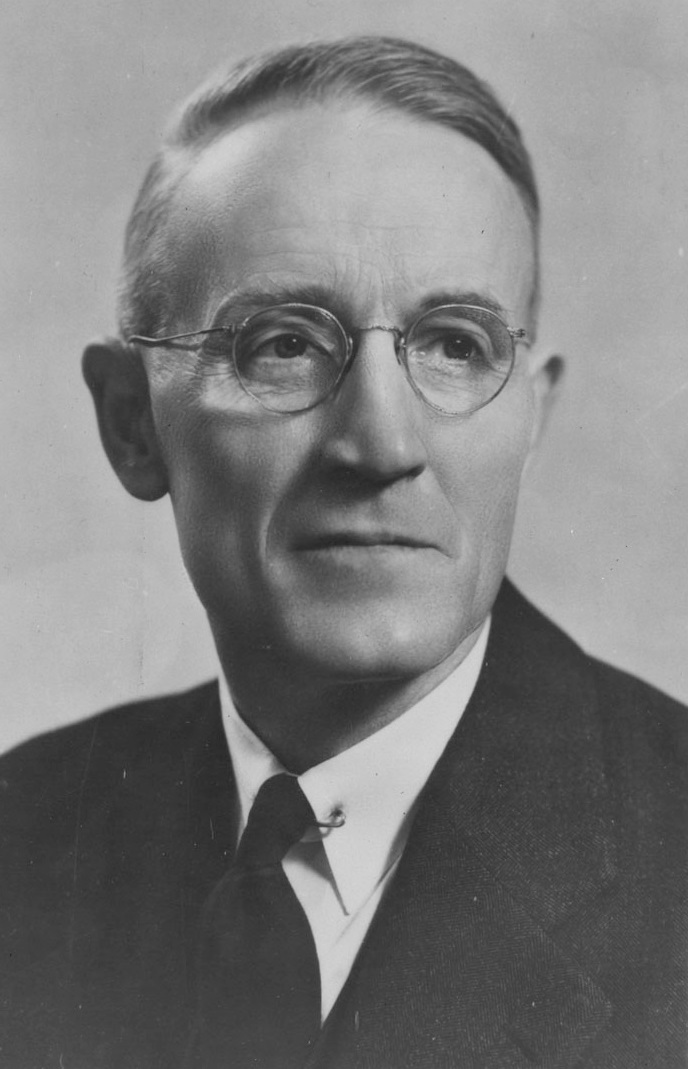

Secretary of State for External Affairs
- In office June 4, 1959 – April 21, 1963
- Prime Minister: John Diefenbaker
- Preceded by: John Diefenbaker
- Succeeded by: Paul Martin Sr.

Minister of Public Works
- In office June 21, 1957 – August 19, 1959
- Preceded by: Robert Winters
- Succeeded by: David James Walker

Member of Parliament for Vancouver South
- In office October 14, 1935 – June 26, 1949
- Preceded by: Angus MacInnis
- Succeeded by: Arthur Laing

Member of Parliament for Vancouver Quadra
- In office June 27, 1949 – April 7, 1963
- Preceded by: Riding established
- Succeeded by: Grant Deachman

Personal details
- Born: November 5, 1895 Kaslo, British Columbia, Canada
- Died: June 26, 1989 (aged 93)
- Party: Conservative
- Relations: Robert Francis Green (uncle)
- Children: John Willison Green (son)

Howard Charles Green PC (November 5, 1895 – June 26, 1989) was a Canadian federal politician.

== Opposition career ==
He was first elected to the House of Commons of Canada in the 1935 federal election as a Conservative from Vancouver, British Columbia in the election which saw the defeat of Prime Minister R. B. Bennett's government. He served as a Member of Parliament (MP) for 28 years. Between his first election in 1935 and the 1949 federal election he was MP for the riding of Vancouver South. From 1949 until he was voted out of office, he represented the riding of Vancouver Quadra.

In 1942, he was a candidate at the party's leadership convention, and placed fourth. At the same convention, the Conservative Party changed its name to the Progressive Conservative Party of Canada.

In 1946, after the sudden death of Royal Maitland, the leader of the British Columbia Progressive Conservatives, Green was courted for the job. Green's leadership would have solved a political problem: under the party's coalition agreement with the Liberal Party, the Conservatives were entitled to the ministerial portfolio of Attorney General, but the party had no other lawyers in caucus; Green, a barrister, would be suited to the job. However, Premier John Hart got around the problem by appointing a Liberal as attorney general while naming two more Tories to cabinet. With the post of attorney general no longer available, Green declined to seek the leadership.

Green was a fierce critic of Louis St. Laurent and Lester B. Pearson's actions in the Suez Crisis. In the debate upon Pearson's return from the United Nations, Green said the Liberal government "by its actions in the Suez crisis, has made this month of November 1956, the most disgraceful period for Canada in the history of this nation," and that it was "high time Canada had a government which will not knife Canada's best friends in the back."

== Ministerial offices ==
When John Diefenbaker became prime minister after a surprise victory in the 1957 Canadian federal election, Green became Minister of Public Works. He became Secretary of State for External Affairs in 1959 following the death of Sidney Earle Smith.

=== Anti-nuclear stance ===
He was a strong supporter of the Commonwealth of Nations and advocated nuclear disarmament, backing Diefenbaker's position against having Canada accept nuclear-tipped Bomarc missiles—a position that led to the resignation of several ministers and contributed to the fall of the Diefenbaker government. He helped promote the country's international role until he was defeated along with the Tory government in the 1963 federal election.

== Archives ==
There is a Howard Charles Green fonds at Library and Archives Canada.

== Bibliography ==
- Pearson, Lester B. (1972). Mike: The Memoirs of the Rt. Hon. Lester B. Pearson. Vol. 2. University of Toronto Press.

Parliament of Canada
Preceded by Angus MacInnis; 1930–1935	Member of Parliament for Vancouver South; 1935–1949	Succeeded by Arthur Laing; 1949–1953
Preceded by First Office-Holder	Member of Parliament for Vancouver Quadra; 1949–1963	Succeeded by Grant Deachman; 1963–1972
18th Canadian Ministry (1957–1963) – Cabinet of John Diefenbaker
Cabinet posts (2)
Predecessor	Office	Successor
John Diefenbaker (Acting)	Secretary of State for External Affairs; 4 Jun 1959 – 21 April 1963	Paul Martin Sr.
Robert Winters	Minister of Public Works; 21 June 1957 – 19 August 1959	David Walker
