= Ayman Cherkaoui =

International jurist in climate change law

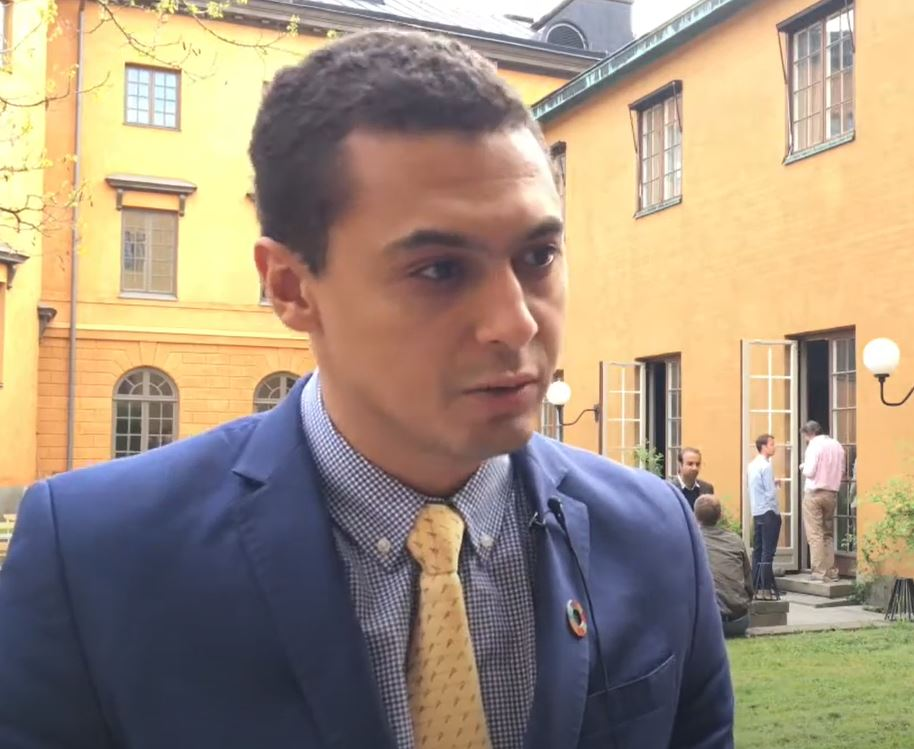
- Born: Morocco
- Education: B.Eng McGill; LL.B Université de Montréal Faculty of Law; M.Sc. Finance EMLYON Business School
- Occupation: Lawyer
- Known for: Environmental activism
- Awards: Obama Foundation "Leaders Africa" Program, 2018 Leaders: Africa

Ayman Cherkaoui is an international jurist in climate change law, Executive Director of the United Nations Global Compact in Morocco, and Lead Counsel for Climate Change at the Centre for International Sustainable Development Law in Montreal Quebec, Canada. Cherkaoui in 2017 was named to the Emerging Leaders Program at the Policy Centre for the New South, and in 2018 was named to the Obama Foundation Leaders: Africa Program.

== Education ==
Cherkaoui completed his undergraduate and graduate studies in Montreal receiving a Bachelor of Mechanical Engineering at McGill University, and a Bachelor of Laws from Université de Montréal Faculty of Law. Cherkaoui also later received a Master of Science from EMLYON Business School in Lyon, France. In addition, Cherkaoui has completed an Adaptation Certificate from University of Oxford, and a Business Sustainability Management Certificate from University of Cambridge.

== Professional career ==
Cherkaoui has served as special advisor for Climate Change and Negotiations to the Minister of the Environment, Morocco, special advisor to the UNFCCC COP22 Presidency, and as a Climate Change Expert with Deutsche Gesellschaft für Internationale Zusammenarbeit (GIZ). Previously, Cherkaoui has worked as a consultant for VALYANS Consulting, International Air Transport Association, and Air Liquide.

His work focuses on technical negotiations under the UNFCCC and legal innovations to support adaptation and mitigation in climate vulnerable countries.

Currently Ayman Cherkaoui is the director of Hassan II International Center for Environmental training.

== Publications ==
Cherkaoui contributed to a number of scholarly articles and technical reports.
