= Vancouver Quadra =

Federal electoral district in British Columbia, Canada

Coordinates: 49.256°N 123.205°W

British Columbia electoral district
- Interactive map of riding boundaries from the 2025 federal election

Federal electoral district
- Legislature: House of Commons
MP
Wade Grant
Liberal
- District created: 1947
- First contested: 1949
- Last contested: 2025
- District webpage: profile, map

Demographics
- Population (2016): 105,608
- Electors (2021): 75,538
- Area (km²): 42
- Pop. density (per km²): 2,514.5
- Census division: Metro Vancouver
- Census subdivision(s): Vancouver (part), Musqueam

Vancouver Quadra is a federal electoral district in the Metro Vancouver region of British Columbia, Canada. It has been represented in the House of Commons of Canada since 1949. The constituency bears the name of the Spanish explorer who surveyed the area in 1775, Juan Francisco de la Bodega y Quadra.

Within the boundaries of this riding are the University of British Columbia and the western portions of the affluent West Side of Vancouver. Voters within Vancouver Quadra have tended to elect centrist candidates, which is an exception to the province as a whole where politics has tended to be more polarized. Though the Liberals have held the seat since 1984, MPs tend to be on the right wing of the party. For example, the previous MP, Joyce Murray, was a cabinet minister in the centre-right British Columbia Liberal Party, which was unaffiliated with the federal Liberal party.

== Demographics ==
This is the sixth wealthiest riding in Canada, with an average family income of over $145,000. As of 2006, this riding had 37% immigrants, most of whom are Chinese-Canadians. The province's largest university, the University of British Columbia, is situated in this riding. The major employer is the professional, scientific and technical service sector. The unemployment rate is 5.2%. Nearly every single-family house in this riding is worth over a million dollars; the median house value is over 2 million dollars.

The Vancouver Quadra riding has a very high level of educational attainment; it has the highest percentage of people with a university certificate or degree in all of Canada (53.1%) and also tops the following educational attainment sub-categories:

- Earned doctorate: 4.7%
- Degree in medicine, dentistry, veterinary medicine or optometry: 2.5%
- Bachelor's degree: 27.4%

Panethnic groups in Vancouver Quadra (2011−2021)
Panethnic group	2021		2016		2011	
Panethnic group	Pop.	%	Pop.	%	Pop.	%
European (Note: Statistic includes all persons that did not make up part of a visible minority or an indigenous identity.)	57,765	53.96%	59,835	58.24%	63,605	63.4%
East Asian (Note: Statistic includes total responses of "Chinese", "Korean", and "Japanese" under visible minority section on census.)	33,805	31.58%	31,615	30.77%	26,990	26.9%
South Asian	3,705	3.46%	2,785	2.71%	2,175	2.17%
Middle Eastern (Note: Statistic includes total responses of "West Asian" and "Arab" under visible minority section on census.)	2,590	2.42%	1,710	1.66%	1,305	1.3%
Southeast Asian (Note: Statistic includes total responses of "Filipino" and "Southeast Asian" under visible minority section on census.)	2,535	2.37%	1,685	1.64%	1,825	1.82%
Indigenous	2,000	1.87%	1,940	1.89%	1,840	1.83%
Latin American	1,700	1.59%	1,295	1.26%	870	0.87%
African	860	0.8%	605	0.59%	575	0.57%
Other (Note: Statistic includes total responses of "Visible minority, n.i.e." and "Multiple visible minorities" under visible minority section on census.)	2,095	1.96%	1,270	1.24%	1,135	1.13%
Total responses	107,055	97.92%	102,740	97.28%	100,325	97.96%
Total population	109,328	100%	105,608	100%	102,416	100%
Notes: Totals greater than 100% due to multiple origin responses. Demographics based on 2012 Canadian federal electoral redistribution riding boundaries.

According to the 2016 Canadian census:

Languages: 66.0% English, 1.6% French, 31.3% other, 1.1% multiple languages
Religions: 27.9% Protestant, 16.3% Catholic, 4.5% Buddhist, 4.2% Other Christian, 3.8% Jewish, 2.4% Christian Orthodox, 1.1% Muslim, 38.5% no religious affiliation
Average income: $46,991

== Geography ==
The district includes the parts of the West Side of Vancouver and the University of British Columbia Endowment Lands.

== History ==
The electoral district was created in 1947 from Vancouver East and Vancouver South ridings. It was a swing riding for most of its first four decades. However, in 1984, John Turner, then Prime Minister, unseated Progressive Conservative incumbent Bill Clarke even as Turner's Liberals suffered what was then the biggest seat loss in Canadian history. It was one of only two Liberal-held seats west of Ontario. The seat has stayed in Liberal hands ever since.

The 2012 federal electoral boundaries redistribution concluded that the electoral boundaries of Vancouver Quadra should be adjusted, and a modified electoral district of the same name will be contested in future elections. The redefined Vancouver Quadra loses a portion of its current territory east of the Arbutus Corridor to the new district of Vancouver Granville. These new boundaries were legally defined in the 2013 representation order, which came into effect upon the call of the 42nd Canadian federal election, scheduled for October 2015.

=== Historical boundaries ===
1947 representation order

1952 representation order

1966 representation order

1976 representation order

1987 representation order

1996 representation order

2003 representation order

2013 representation order

== Members of Parliament ==
This riding has elected the following members of Parliament:

Parliament	Years	Member	Party
Vancouver Quadra; Riding created from Vancouver East and Vancouver South
21st	1949–1953	Howard Charles Green	Progressive Conservative
22nd	1953–1957	Howard Charles Green	Progressive Conservative
23rd	1957–1958	Howard Charles Green	Progressive Conservative
24th	1958–1962	Howard Charles Green	Progressive Conservative
25th	1962–1963	Howard Charles Green	Progressive Conservative
26th	1963–1965	Grant Deachman	Liberal
27th	1965–1968	Grant Deachman	Liberal
28th	1968–1972	Grant Deachman	Liberal
29th	1972–1974	Bill Clarke	Progressive Conservative
30th	1974–1979	Bill Clarke	Progressive Conservative
31st	1979–1980	Bill Clarke	Progressive Conservative
32nd	1980–1984	Bill Clarke	Progressive Conservative
33rd	1984–1988	John Turner	Liberal
34th	1988–1993	John Turner	Liberal
35th	1993–1997	Ted McWhinney	Liberal
36th	1997–2000	Ted McWhinney	Liberal
37th	2000–2004	Stephen Owen	Liberal
38th	2004–2006	Stephen Owen	Liberal
39th	2006–2007	Stephen Owen	Liberal
39th	2008–2008	Joyce Murray	Liberal
40th	2008–2011	Joyce Murray	Liberal
41st	2011–2015	Joyce Murray	Liberal
42nd	2015–2019	Joyce Murray	Liberal
43rd	2019–2021	Joyce Murray	Liberal
44th	2021–2025	Joyce Murray	Liberal
45th	2025–present	Wade Grant	Liberal

== Election results ==
Graph of election results in Vancouver Quadra (minor parties that never got 2% of the vote or didn't run consistently are omitted) View source data.

2025 Canadian federal election
Party	Candidate	Votes	%	±%	Expenditures
Liberal	Wade Grant	35,384	63.19	+19.80	$97,232.30
Conservative	Ken Charko	17,008	30.37	+1.15	$111,444.13
New Democratic	Alim Fakirani	2,391	4.27	–15.12	$12,680.64
Green	Tom Digby	1,032	1.84	–4.12	$5,660.00
People's	John Odan Ede	182	0.33	–1.71	$2,304.34
Total valid votes/expense limit		55,997	99.28	–	$128,292.43
Total rejected ballots		407	0.72	+0.12	
Turnout		56,404	68.82	+6.17	
Eligible voters		81,957			
Liberal notional hold		Swing		+9.33	
Source: Elections Canada

2021 federal election redistributed results
Party	Vote	%
Liberal	21,464	43.39
Conservative	14,455	29.22
New Democratic	9,593	19.39
Green	2,950	5.96
People's	1,004	2.03

2021 Canadian federal election
Party	Candidate	Votes	%	±%	Expenditures
Liberal	Joyce Murray	20,814	43.63	+0.10	$93,921.31
Conservative	Brad Armstrong	13,786	28.90	+1.15	$103,409.23
New Democratic	Naden Abenes	9,220	19.33	+4.19	$9,885.59
Green	Devyani Singh	2,922	6.13	–6.30	$18,663.20
People's	Renate Siekmann	963	2.02	+1.18	$20,173.89
Total valid votes/expense limit		47,705	99.39	–	$108,762.68
Total rejected ballots		291	0.61	+0.11	
Turnout		47,996	62.65	–4.49	
Eligible voters		76,613			
Liberal hold		Swing		–0.53	
Source: Elections Canada

2019 Canadian federal election
Party	Candidate	Votes	%	±%	Expenditures
Liberal	Joyce Murray	22,093	43.53	–15.18	$90,017.99
Conservative	Kathleen Dixon	14,082	27.75	+1.91	$104,509.91
New Democratic	Leigh Kenny	7,681	15.13	+4.28	$8,074.37
Green	Geoff Wright	6,308	12.43	+8.22	$9,668.18
People's	Sandra Filosof-Schipper	428	0.84	–	$1,463.92
Independent	Austen Erhardt	162	0.32	–	$769.45
Total valid votes/expense limit		50,754	99.51	–	$105,408.01
Total rejected ballots		251	0.49	+0.22	
Turnout		51,005	67.14	–2.71	
Eligible voters		75,967			
Liberal hold		Swing		–8.54	
Source: Elections Canada

2015 Canadian federal election
Party	Candidate	Votes	%	±%	Expenditures
Liberal	Joyce Murray	31,102	58.71	+15.25	$97,238.16
Conservative	Blair Lockhart	13,683	25.83	–10.60	$138,478.02
New Democratic	Scott Andrews	5,748	10.85	–3.60	$28,356.72
Green	Kris Constable	2,229	4.21	–1.44	$9,999.97
Pirate	Trevor Clinton Walper	86	0.16	–	$246.50
Marijuana	Marc Boyer	65	0.12	–	none listed
Independent	Jean-François Caron	59	0.11	–	$20.80
Total valid votes/expense limit		52,972	99.73	–	$207,109.54
Total rejected ballots		144	0.27	+0.01	
Turnout		53,116	69.85	+7.43	
Eligible voters		76,038			
Liberal hold		Swing		+12.92	
Source: Elections Canada

2011 federal election redistributed results
Party	Vote	%
Liberal	20,226	43.47
Conservative	16,953	36.43
New Democratic	6,723	14.45
Green	2,629	5.65

2011 Canadian federal election
Party	Candidate	Votes	%	±%	Expenditures
Liberal	Joyce Murray	22,903	42.17	–3.42	$76,215.01
Conservative	Deborah Meredith	20,984	38.64	+1.72	$86,722.92
New Democratic	Victor Edward Elkins	7,499	13.81	+5.74	$14,170.92
Green	Laura-Leah Shaw	2,922	5.38	–3.45	$6,096.85
Total valid votes/expense limit		54,308	99.74	–	$91,721.98
Total rejected ballots		144	0.26	–0.02	
Turnout		54,452	62.43	–0.94	
Eligible voters		87,224			
Liberal hold		Swing		–2.58	
Source: Elections Canada

2008 Canadian federal election
Party	Candidate	Votes	%	±%	Expenditures
Liberal	Joyce Murray	25,393	45.59	+9.54	$78,396.28
Conservative	Deborah Meredith	20,561	36.92	+1.40	$81,277.26
Green	Dan Grice	4,916	8.83	–4.64	$6,584.14
New Democratic	David Caplan	4,493	8.07	–6.36	$19,537.01
Libertarian	Norris Barens	333	0.60	–	none listed
Total valid votes/expense limit		55,696	99.72	–	$89,045.82
Total rejected ballots		158	0.28	+0.01	
Turnout		55,854	63.37	+29.58	
Eligible voters		88,146			
Liberal hold		Swing		+4.08	
Source: Elections Canada

Canadian federal by-election, March 17, 2008 By-election due to the resignation of Stephen Owen
Party	Candidate	Votes	%	±%	Expenditures
Liberal	Joyce Murray	10,155	36.05	–13.09	$71,893.89
Conservative	Deborah Meredith	10,004	35.52	+6.63	$86,019.40
New Democratic	Rebeccca Coad	4,064	14.43	–1.65	$58,965.05
Green	Dan Grice	3,792	13.46	+8.36	$36,542.40
Rhinoceros	John Turner	111	0.39	–	none listed
Canadian Action	Psamuel Frank	40	0.14	–	$63.65
Total valid votes/expense limit		28,166	99.73	–	$87,207.82
Total rejected ballots		77	0.27	+0.05	
Turnout		28,243	33.78	–33.77	
Eligible voters		83,602			
Liberal hold		Swing		–9.86	
Source: Elections Canada

2006 Canadian federal election
Party	Candidate	Votes	%	±%	Expenditures
Liberal	Stephen Owen	28,655	49.14	–3.29	$65,964.63
Conservative	Stephen Rogers	16,844	28.89	+2.57	$80,275.03
New Democratic	David Askew	9,379	16.08	+1.09	$26,795.14
Green	Ben West	2,974	5.10	–0.50	$1,187.00
Independent	Betty Krawczyk	263	0.45	–	$1,304.82
Marijuana	Marc Boyer	158	0.27	–	none listed
Marxist–Leninist	Donovan Young	41	0.07	–0.02	none listed
Total valid votes/expense limit		58,314	99.78	–	$82,819.00
Total rejected ballots		131	0.22	–0.07	
Turnout		58,445	67.56	+1.03	
Eligible voters		86,513			
Liberal hold		Swing		–2.94	
Source: Elections Canada

2004 Canadian federal election
Party	Candidate	Votes	%	±%	Expenditures
Liberal	Stephen Owen	29,187	52.43	+7.60	$68,530.85
Conservative	Stephen Rogers	14,648	26.31	–19.47	$75,691.94
New Democratic	David Askew	8,348	15.00	+9.77	$46,335.66
Green	Doug Warkentin	3,118	5.60	+2.71	$4,451.94
Canadian Action	Connie Fogal	165	0.30	–0.49	$5,222.22
Libertarian	Katrina Chowne	151	0.27	–	none listed
Marxist–Leninist	Donovan Young	48	0.09	–0.13	none listed
Total valid votes/expense limit		55,665	99.71	–	$80,003.43
Total rejected ballots		164	0.29	–0.10	
Turnout		55,829	66.53	+3.19	
Eligible voters		83,918			
Liberal hold		Swing		+13.54	
Change for the Conservatives is based on the combined totals of the Canadian Alliance and the Progressive Conservatives.
Source: Elections Canada

2000 Canadian federal election
Party	Candidate	Votes	%	±%	Expenditures
Liberal	Stephen Owen	22,253	44.84	+2.69	$60,542
Alliance	Kerry-Lynne Findlay	18,613	37.50	+9.91	$64,240
Progressive Conservative	Bill Clarke	4,112	8.28	–8.59	$12,355
New Democratic	Loretta Woodcock	2,595	5.23	–4.80	$10,844
Green	Doug Warkentin	1,434	2.89	+0.31	$16,556
Canadian Action	Chris Shaw	390	0.79	–	$5,683
Natural Law	Steven R. Beck	126	0.25	–0.22	none listed
Marxist–Leninist	Anne Jamieson	109	0.22	–0.08	$18
Total valid votes		49,632	99.61		
Total rejected ballots		194	0.39	–0.06	
Turnout		49,826	63.34	–4.42	
Eligible voters		78,664			
Liberal hold		Swing		–3.61	
Change for the Canadian Alliance is based on the Reform Party.
Source: Elections Canada

1997 Canadian federal election
Party	Candidate	Votes	%	±%	Expenditures
Liberal	Ted McWhinney	18,847	42.14	+2.69	$55,589
Reform	Joanne Easdown	12,340	27.59	+5.42	$57,114
Progressive Conservative	Geoff Chutter	7,546	16.87	–0.57	$53,095
New Democratic	Donovan T. Kuehn	4,486	10.03	–0.73	$11,981
Green	Kelly Elizabeth White	1,155	2.58	+1.43	none listed
Natural Law	Alan Mackenzie Brooke	211	0.47	–0.26	none listed
Marxist–Leninist	Anne Jamieson	135	0.30	+0.15	none listed
Total valid votes		44,720	99.55		
Total rejected ballots		202	0.45	–0.35	
Turnout		44,922	67.76	+1.12	
Eligible voters		66,299			
Liberal hold		Swing		–1.36	
Source: Elections Canada

1993 Canadian federal election
Party	Candidate	Votes	%	±%
Liberal	Ted McWhinney	20,364	39.46	–4.49
Reform	Bill McArthur	11,445	22.18	+20.14
Progressive Conservative	Geoff Chutter	9,002	17.44	–13.05
New Democratic	Tommy Tao	5,552	10.76	–10.63
National	W.J. Willy Spat	3,331	6.45	–
Green	Alannah New-Small	594	1.15	–
Libertarian	Walter Boytinck	410	0.79	+0.56
Natural Law	Alan M. Brooke	376	0.73	–
Christian Heritage	Walter Opmeer	208	0.40	–
Independent	Janet Ludlam	100	0.19	–
Independent	Roman York	90	0.17	–
Marxist–Leninist	Dorothy-Jean O'Donnell	80	0.16	–
Commonwealth of Canada	J.G. Joseph Jackman	59	0.11	+0.07
Total valid votes		51,552	99.20	
Total rejected ballots		416	0.80	+0.16
Turnout		51,968	66.64	–13.51
Eligible voters		77,987		
Liberal hold		Swing		–12.32
Source: Elections Canada

1988 Canadian federal election
Party	Candidate	Votes	%	±%
Liberal	John Turner	24,021	43.95	+0.02
Progressive Conservative	Bill Clarke	16,664	30.49	–6.97
New Democratic	Gerry Scott	11,687	21.38	+4.56
Reform	J.R. Jack Ford	1,112	2.03	–
Rhinoceros	John Turner	760	1.39	+0.95
Libertarian	Walter Boytinck	129	0.24	+0.06
Communist	Bert Ogden	75	0.14	–
Independent	Albert A. Ritchie	74	0.14	–
Independent	Blair Longley	52	0.10	–
Confederation of Regions	Nora Galenzoski	35	0.06	–
Commonwealth of Canada	J.G. Joseph Jackman	23	0.04	+0.00
Independent	Allen H. Soroka	22	0.04	–
Total valid votes		54,654	99.36	
Total rejected ballots		353	0.64	+0.20
Turnout		55,007	80.15	–5.18
Eligible voters		68,631		
Liberal hold		Swing		+3.50
Source: Elections Canada

1984 Canadian federal election
Party	Candidate	Votes	%	±%
Liberal	John Turner	21,794	43.94	+13.23
Progressive Conservative	Bill Clarke	18,581	37.46	–8.63
New Democratic	Ray Cantillon	8,343	16.82	–4.93
Green	Jim Bohlen	389	0.78	–
Rhinoceros	Ian McConkey	219	0.44	–0.45
Independent	Diane Jones	111	0.22	–
Libertarian	Marco Den Ouden	87	0.18	–
Independent	Bill Burgess	28	0.06	–0.16
Independent	David Michael Shebib	20	0.04	–
Commonwealth of Canada	T. Gaetan Feuille D'érable Wall	20	0.04	–
Independent	J.G. Joseph Jackman	12	0.02	–
Total valid votes		49,604	99.56	
Total rejected ballots		220	0.44	+0.16
Turnout		49,824	85.33	+13.07
Eligible voters		58,392		
Liberal gain from Progressive Conservative		Swing		+10.93
Source: Elections Canada

1980 Canadian federal election
Party	Candidate	Votes	%	±%
Progressive Conservative	Bill Clarke	20,993	46.09	+0.52
Liberal	Peter Pearse	13,987	30.71	+1.31
New Democratic	Alan Bush	9,907	21.75	–2.71
Rhinoceros	Verne John Eh McDonald	405	0.89	–
Social Credit	Elaine Wanstall	104	0.23	–
Independent	Peter Rabbit Milne	73	0.16	–
Marxist–Leninist	Allen H. Soroka	50	0.11	–0.04
Independent	Byron Nelson	26	0.06	–
Total valid votes		45,545	99.72	
Total rejected ballots		127	0.28	–0.26
Turnout		45,672	72.26	–5.55
Eligible voters		63,206		
Progressive Conservative hold		Swing		+0.40
Source: Elections Canada

1979 Canadian federal election
Party	Candidate	Votes	%	±%
Progressive Conservative	Bill Clarke	19,869	45.57	–2.69
Liberal	Paul Manning	12,820	29.40	–10.09
New Democratic	Alan Bush	10,665	24.46	+13.13
Libertarian	Campbell Osborne	144	0.33	–
Marxist–Leninist	David Fuller	64	0.15	–0.16
Independent	Fred Gilbertson	37	0.08	–
Total valid votes		43,599	99.46	
Total rejected ballots		236	0.54	+0.20
Turnout		43,835	77.81	–1.23
Eligible voters		56,336		
Progressive Conservative hold		Swing		+3.70
Source: Elections Canada

1974 Canadian federal election
Party	Candidate	Votes	%	±%
Progressive Conservative	Bill Clarke	18,892	48.26	+5.69
Liberal	Frank Low-Beer	15,458	39.49	+3.55
New Democratic	Nigel Nixon	4,434	11.33	–8.82
Social Credit	Edith Garner	179	0.46	–0.45
Marxist–Leninist	Brian Sproule	120	0.31	–
Independent	Norman G. Dent	61	0.16	–
Total valid votes		39,144	99.66	
Total rejected ballots		133	0.34	–0.41
Turnout		39,277	79.04	–2.42
Eligible voters		49,692		
Progressive Conservative hold		Swing		+1.07
Source: Library of Parliament

1972 Canadian federal election
Party	Candidate	Votes	%	±%
Progressive Conservative	Bill Clarke	17,767	42.57	+12.27
Liberal	Grant Deachman	15,001	35.94	–18.34
New Democratic	Nigel Nixon	8,411	20.15	+5.20
Social Credit	Edith Garner	378	0.91	–
Independent	Rupert Beebe	180	0.43	–
Total valid votes		41,737	99.25	
Total rejected ballots		316	0.75	+0.26
Turnout		42,053	81.46	+0.24
Eligible voters		51,621		
Progressive Conservative gain from Liberal		Swing		+15.30
Source: Library of Parliament

1968 Canadian federal election
Party	Candidate	Votes	%	±%
Liberal	Grant Deachman	20,788	54.29	+15.45
Progressive Conservative	John A. Pearkes	11,604	30.30	–7.49
New Democratic	George E. Trasov	5,727	14.96	–1.13
Republican	Robert Hein	175	0.46	–
Total valid votes		38,294	99.51	
Total rejected ballots		190	0.49	–0.14
Turnout		38,484	81.22	–0.14
Eligible voters		47,381		
Liberal hold		Swing		+11.47
Source: Library of Parliament

1965 Canadian federal election
Party	Candidate	Votes	%	±%
Liberal	Grant Deachman	12,895	38.84	–2.90
Progressive Conservative	Howard Charles Green	12,549	37.80	–0.07
New Democratic	George E. Trasov	5,342	16.09	+1.43
Social Credit	Donald W. Gosse	2,416	7.28	+1.54
Total valid votes		33,202	99.37	
Total rejected ballots		212	0.63	+0.17
Turnout		33,414	81.36	–2.92
Eligible voters		41,068		
Liberal hold		Swing		–1.42
Source: Library of Parliament

1963 Canadian federal election
Party	Candidate	Votes	%	±%
Liberal	Grant Deachman	15,160	41.73	+10.66
Progressive Conservative	Howard Charles Green	13,756	37.87	–7.59
New Democratic	Dorothy Steeves	5,324	14.66	–2.49
Social Credit	James P.R. Mason	2,085	5.74	–0.59
Total valid votes		36,325	99.53	
Total rejected ballots		170	0.47	–0.32
Turnout		36,495	84.29	+4.81
Eligible voters		43,299		
Liberal gain from Progressive Conservative		Swing		+9.12
Source: Library of Parliament

1962 Canadian federal election
Party	Candidate	Votes	%	±%
Progressive Conservative	Howard Charles Green	15,113	45.46	–25.26
Liberal	Grant Deachman	10,331	31.07	+14.79
New Democratic	Philip H. Waddell	5,699	17.14	+7.17
Social Credit	Emil Peter Schafer	2,103	6.33	+3.30
Total valid votes		33,246	99.22	
Total rejected ballots		262	0.78	+0.09
Turnout		33,508	79.48	+1.33
Eligible voters		42,161		
Progressive Conservative hold		Swing		–20.02
Change for the New Democrats is based on the Co-operative Commonwealth.
Source: Library of Parliament

1958 Canadian federal election
Party	Candidate	Votes	%	±%
Progressive Conservative	Howard Charles Green	24,802	70.72	+6.78
Liberal	Francis Cecil Boyes	5,713	16.29	+0.33
Co-operative Commonwealth	Bill Pierce	3,496	9.97	+1.26
Social Credit	Stephen Halom	1,062	3.03	–8.37
Total valid votes		35,073	99.31	
Total rejected ballots		243	0.69	–0.15
Turnout		35,316	78.15	+0.72
Eligible voters		45,190		
Progressive Conservative hold		Swing		+3.22
Source: Library of Parliament

1957 Canadian federal election
Party	Candidate	Votes	%	±%
Progressive Conservative	Howard Charles Green	21,719	63.93	+20.11
Liberal	Ted R. Burnett	5,423	15.96	–10.76
Social Credit	Christy McDevitt	3,871	11.39	–5.61
Co-operative Commonwealth	James Gibson Lorimer	2,959	8.71	–3.74
Total valid votes		33,972	99.17	
Total rejected ballots		286	0.83	+0.21
Turnout		34,258	77.43	+9.82
Eligible voters		44,246		
Progressive Conservative hold		Swing		+15.44
Source: Library of Parliament

1953 Canadian federal election
Party	Candidate	Votes	%	±%
Progressive Conservative	Howard Charles Green	12,769	43.82	–6.31
Liberal	Russell Charles Gordon	7,786	26.72	–5.37
Social Credit	Tom Boothman	4,955	17.01	–
Co-operative Commonwealth	Gordon Dowding	3,628	12.45	–5.33
Total valid votes		29,138	99.38	
Total rejected ballots		182	0.62	–0.26
Turnout		29,320	67.61	–0.21
Eligible voters		43,367		
Progressive Conservative hold		Swing		–0.47
Source: Library of Parliament

1949 Canadian federal election
Party	Candidate	Votes	%	±%
Progressive Conservative	Howard Charles Green	16,661	50.13	–
Liberal	Thomas Foster Isherwood	10,665	32.09	–
Co-operative Commonwealth	Harold Winston Mason	5,908	17.78	–
Total valid votes		33,234	99.12	
Total rejected ballots		296	0.88	–
Turnout		33,530	67.82	–
Eligible voters		49,439		
This riding was created from parts of Vancouver East and Vancouver South, which elected a Co-operative Commonwealth and a Progressive Conservative, respectively, in the previous election. Howard Charles Green was the incumbent from Vancouver South.
Source: Library of Parliament

== See also ==
- List of Canadian electoral districts
- Historical federal electoral districts of Canada
