= Commission on Resources and Environment =

Commission on Resources and Environment (CORE) was a collaborative planning model used in British Columbia from 1992-1996. Participating stakeholders negotiated a consensus-based agreement about regional and local resource use goals. CORE's Commissioner was Stephen Owen, former provincial Ombudsdman. CORE was formed by NDP Premier Michael Harcourt. These collaborative processes focused on four British Columbia regions: Vancouver Island, the Cariboo-Chilcotin, and the East and West Kootenays. The accomplishments of each region was varied, but none were able to reach full agreement on land use designation.

== Results ==
In 1994, CORE published the Provincial Land Use Strategy and called for the objectives described in these plans to be legally binding. Lack of political will resulted in inaction, and land use objectives outside of protected areas were not made legal. The draft integrated land use plans for the four areas created too much controversy and the Provincial government was concerned about CORE as an independent body creating so much political backlash, so the Cabinet reclaimed direct control of the land use planning process and placed it under leadership of a new interministry Land Use Co-ordination Office (LUCO). LUCO not only continued the initial participatory planning process but over the next decade expanded it to cover most of the province. Plans for some areas such as Vancouver Island fell short of public expectations. In contrast a most notable accomplishment was the plan for the vast northern Muskwa-Ketchika area. By 2006 over 85% of the Province was covered by 26 approved regional plans (LRMPs). The program continued even after the election of a new Liberal government. Most notable was extension of plans to the mid coast area; more popularly known as the Great Bear Rainforest. Although these regional plans do not resolve all land use conflicts between First Nations, conservation, energy, forestry and mining interests they do provide a framework for decision making and resource allocation. And most notable an outcome of the Land Use Strategy was the associated success of the Protected Area Strategy(PAS) which identified hundreds of areas for inclusion in the provincial parks system which by 2001 had expanded from 6% to meet the IUCN target of 12%. As of January 2015 that parks and protected areas system now includes 1029 designated areas which totals 14,042,696 ha. BC will likely be one of a very few government jurisdictions to meet the new international target of 17% and steps are underway for designation of numerous new Marine Protected Areas.(MPA's)

Although CORE was not there to see the fulfillment of their lofty objectives they initiated a participatory regional integrated land use planning process over next two decades with some remarkable outcomes. [James Anderson; author of BCs Magnificent Parks (2011) Harbour Publishing)]
