= Stephen Owen (politician) =

Canadian administrator and politician (1948–2023)

The Honourable Stephen Owen PC KC

Minister of State (Sport)
- In office July 20, 2004 – February 5, 2006
- Prime Minister: Paul Martin
- Preceded by: Stan Keyes
- Succeeded by: Michael Chong

Member of Parliament for Vancouver Quadra
- In office November 27, 2000 – July 27, 2007
- Preceded by: Ted McWhinney
- Succeeded by: Joyce Murray

Personal details
- Born: Stephen Douglas Owen; September 8, 1948 Vancouver, British Columbia, Canada
- Died: June 29, 2023 (aged 74) Vancouver, British Columbia, Canada
- Party: Liberal
- Spouse: Diane Owen (m. 1971)
- Relatives: Walter Stewart Owen (uncle); Philip Owen (cousin)
- Profession: Lawyer; professor

Stephen Douglas Owen PC KC (September 8, 1948 – June 29, 2023) was a Canadian lawyer, administrator and politician. From 2000 to 2007 he served as Member of Parliament for the electoral district of Vancouver Quadra, encompassing the western end of the City of Vancouver. As part of the Liberal Party of Canada caucus, he was a member of Prime Minister Paul Martin's government, serving in cabinet as Minister of Public Works and Government Services from 2003 to 2004, and as Minister of Western Economic Diversification and Minister of State for Sport from 2004 to 2006. He left parliament to join the University of British Columbia (UBC) as the vice-president of External, Legal and Community Relations, serving in that role until 2012.

== Early life and career ==
Born in Vancouver on September 8, 1948, Owen attended Shawnigan Lake School on Vancouver Island before studying at UBC, graduating with a law degree in 1972. He went on to receive an LL.M. from University College London/University of London in 1974, and an MBA from the International Management Institute at the University of Geneva in 1986. In 1975 he began a two-year assignment with Canadian University Service Overseas teaching high school in Nigeria, before returning to Canada in 1977 to work as a staff lawyer with the legal aid office in Surrey, eventually becoming executive director of the Legal Services Society of British Columbia.

During the 1980s and 1990s, Owen worked for the government of British Columbia as a non-partisan official. He served as that province's ombudsman from 1986 to 1992, and as Commissioner for the ground-breaking Commission on Resources and Environment, which pioneered the province's multi-stakeholder land-use planning approach, from 1992 to 1995. After serving as Deputy Attorney General for B.C. from 1995 to 1997, he joined the University of Victoria as David Lam Professor of Law and Public Policy, and director of the university's Institute for Dispute Resolution. He concurrently served as commissioner and vice-president of the Law Commission of Canada from 1997 to 2000.

== Federal politics ==
Owen ran as the Liberal candidate in Vancouver Quadra at the 2000 federal election, defeating Kerry-Lynne Findlay of the Canadian Alliance to become the riding's Member of Parliament. He was appointed Secretary of State for both Western Economic Diversification and Indian Affairs and Northern Development by Prime Minister Jean Chrétien on January 15, 2002. On December 12, 2003, Owen was promoted by the newly appointed Martin to Minister of Public Works and Government Services. In this capacity, he was a frequent target of opposition questions on the "sponsorship scandal". During his tenure, Owen was involved in the recovery of misappropriated public funds from Hewlett-Packard; the company paid C$146 million to the government of Canada, and both parties agreed to jointly pursue companies who may also have been involved.

Owen defeated former provincial cabinet minister and Conservative candidate Stephen Rogers in the federal election of 2004, receiving 52% of the vote compared to Rogers' 26%. He was named Minister of Western Economic Diversification and Minister of State for Sport on July 20, 2004. Under normal circumstances, this would have been considered a demotion, but the shuffle placed Owen in a powerful managerial position for preparation for the upcoming Winter Olympics in British Columbia.

During the federal election of 2006, held to elect the 39th Parliament, Owen again defeated Rogers and maintained his seat in Vancouver Quadra. With the Liberals becoming the Official Opposition, Owen was named critic for democratic reform. Following the election, Owen endorsed Michael Ignatieff for the Liberal Party leadership to replace the outgoing Paul Martin.

Owen resigned his seat on July 27, 2007, to become UBC's vice-president of External, Legal and Community Relations, finishing his five-year term in 2012.

== Personal life ==
Owen married his wife Diane in 1971; the couple had two sons together. His cousin Philip Owen is a former mayor of Vancouver, and uncle Walter Stewart Owen served as Lieutenant-Governor of British Columbia from 1973 to 1978.

Owen died at a care home in Vancouver on June 29, 2023, at age 74. He had dementia in the years leading up to his death.

27th Canadian Ministry (2003–2006) – Cabinet of Paul Martin
Cabinet posts (3)
Predecessor	Office	Successor
Rey Pagtakhan	Minister of Western Economic Diversification; 2004–2006	Carol Skelton
Stan Keyes	Minister of State (Sport); 2004–2006	Michael Chong
Ralph Goodale	Minister of Public Works and Government Services; 2003–2004	Scott Brison
26th Canadian Ministry (1993–2003) – Cabinet of Jean Chrétien
Sub-Cabinet Post
Predecessor	Title	Successor
	Secretary of State (Western Economic Diversification) (Indian Affairs and Northern Development) (2002–2003)	
