= Global Open Data for Agriculture and Nutrition =

Global initiative to support agriculture

Global Open Data for Agriculture and Nutrition (GODAN) is an initiative that seeks to "support global efforts to make agricultural and nutritionally relevant data available, accessible, and usable for unrestricted use worldwide. The initiative focuses on building high-level policy as well as public and private institutional support for open data."

The initiative was launched in 2013, one year after the G8 summit in 2012 where G-8 leaders "committed to the New Alliance for Food Security and Nutrition as the next phase of a shared commitment to achieving global food security."

According to the Open Data Institute, farmers and other stakeholders on the agriculture supply chain can make more informed decisions resulting in improved yields and efficiency – from farm to fork, when they have free access to useful information on agriculture and nutrition.

== Partners ==
GODAN and its partners aim to support the open data revolution and hosted the 2016 GODAN summit in New York in September. GODAN has over 400 partners from government, international and private organisations around the world. In the bid to support the open data revolution, the UK Department for Environment, Food and Rural Affairs made over 8,000 data sets available for free use in June 2015.

In 2021, GODAN became a member of Global Waste Cleaning Network (GWCN).

== Secretariat ==
The GODAN secretariat was hosted by CABI in Wallingford, UK, from 2014 to 2019, and is now hosted by the Department of Food Science, Nutrition and Technology at the University of Nairobi, following a brief period at McGill University from 2020 to 2022. Its research and partnerships offices that were based in Wageningen, Netherlands, and Rome, Italy. are now hosted at the University of Nairobi with a demonstration station in Murang'a County, Kenya, in Kangema, Murang'a under the hosting of the Programme for Capacity Development in Africa.

== Resources and financing ==
"During its London and donor-supported paradigm, the GODAN Secretariat had an estimated five-year budget of $8.5 million, with five full-time employees. but is not reengineering its existence from Grants to co-creation project and platform development globally. During its heyday with partners, GODAN's activities and Secretariat were financially supported by the US Government, the UK Department for International Development (maximum of £2.5 over 5 years), the Government of the Netherlands, the UN Food and Agriculture Organization (FAO), Technical Centre for Agricultural and Rural Cooperation ACP-EU (CTA) Global Forum on Agricultural Research (GFAR), The Open Data Institute (ODI), the Consultative Group for International Agricultural Research (CGIAR) and the CABI."

== Governance ==
Then GODAN Secretariat was governed by a group of GODAN partners, including the US Government, the UK's DFID, the Netherlands Government, the Open Data Institute, FAO, CTA, CABI, CGIAR, and GFAR.

== Activities ==
=== GODAN Summit 2016 ===
In September 2016, GODAN held a two-day summit in New York described as “the largest event of its kind”, with the aim of raising awareness of the call for making agricultural and nutrition data open. The event featured high profile guests including then U.S. Agriculture Secretary Tom Vilsack and Willy Bett, Kenyan Minister of Agriculture, Livestock, and Fisheries.
