= Markus Gehring =

- Born: Germany
- Education: Dr iur, University of Hamburg; LLM, Yale University; MA (by conferral), University of Cambridge; JSD, Yale University
- Spouse: Marie-Claire Cordonier Segger
- Awards: BIICL, Arthur Watts Senior Research Fellowship in Public International Law, 2017

Markus Gehring is an international jurist specialised in European and international trade law, and both fellow and director of studies in law at Hughes Hall at University of Cambridge. He is also a senior fellow at the Centre for International Governance Innovation.

== Education ==
Gehring completed his undergraduate legal studies at the Faculty of Law at the University of Hamburg and holds a Master of Laws from Yale University. Following a hiatus for teaching and writing, Gehring completed a Doctor of Juridical Science from Yale University. Gehring also holds a Master of Arts from the University of Cambridge conferred unto him pursuant to section B II 2 of the university's Statutes.

== Professional career ==
Having begun his teaching career at University of Oxford, Gehring joined the University of Cambridge in 2005 as a lecturer in European and international law, later becoming a tutor in sustainable development law in 2010, and eventually a lecturer and fellow in law at Hughes Hall, University of Cambridge. During this time, he also served as the vice-dean of research and Jean Monnet Research Chair (ad personam) in sustainable development law at the University of Ottawa Faculty of Law. Gehring also serves as lecturer in European and international law in the Politics and International Studies (POLIS) department, a senior research associate at the Centre for Rising Powers, an associate for the Centre for Climate Mitigation Research (4CMR), and a founding fellow of the Centre for Environment, Energy and Natural Resources Governance (C-EENRG).

In 2017, Gehring was appointed as the Sir Arthur Watts Senior Research Fellow in Public International Law with the British Institute of International and Comparative Law (BIICL).

In addition to his academic work, Gehring is a member of the bar in Frankfurt/Main and Ontario, and formally Brussels.

In the 2015 Cambridge City Council election, Gehring was elected as councillor for the Cambridge City Council, representing Newnham, Cambridgeshire.

== Publications ==
Gehring has edited or contributed to nearly 20 books and authored over 80 papers. Representative publications include:

- Transparency in International Investment Arbitration (Cambridge University Press, 2018), editor with Dimitrij Euler, and Maxi Scherer.
- Responsibility, Fraternity and Sustainability in Law – In Memory of the Honourable Charles Doherty Gonthier / Responsabilité, Fraternité et Développement Durable en Droit – En mémoire de l'honorable Charles Doherty Gonthier (LexisNexis, 2012), editor with Michel Morin, Fabien Gelinas, and Marie-Claire Cordonier Segger.
- Sustainable Development in World Investment Law (Kluwer Law International, 2010), editor with Marie-Claire Cordonier Segger, and Andrew Newcombe.
- World Trade Law in Practice (Global Law and Business, 2007), with Marie-Claire Cordonier Segger and Jarrod Hepburn.
- Sustainable Development in World Trade Law (Kluwer Law International, 2005), editor with Marie-Claire Cordonier Segger.
