= Republican Party of Canada =

Political party in Canada

The Republican Party of Canada was founded in 1967. It nominated two candidates in the 1968 federal election in Vancouver: Gerald Guejon won 420 votes (0.9% of the total) in Vancouver Centre, and Robert Hein won 175 votes (0.5%) in Vancouver Quadra.

In 2021, Rob Carbone adopted the name for his own unregistered political party during the 2019 federal election, a group previously known as the Progressive Party.
