= Centre for International Sustainable Development Law =

International legal research center

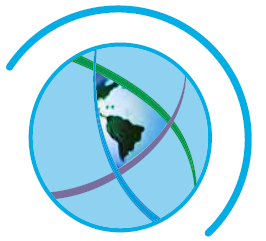
The Centre for International Sustainable Development Law

The Center for International Sustainable Development Law (CISDL) is an international legal research center that promotes sustainable societies and the protection of ecosystems.

The CISDL is led by a Board of Governors and guided by a roster of honoured international advisors and expert collaborators. The CISDL is engaged in six primary areas of sustainable development law research, each of which is led by a CISDL Lead Counsel based at a developing or developed country law faculty or international organisation. These include Trade, Investment & Competition Law; Biodiversity & Biosafety Law; Health & Hazards Law; Climate Change Law; Human Rights & Poverty Eradication; Natural Resources Law;Governance; and Institutions & Accountability. The CISDL has consultative status with the United Nations Economic and Social Council (ECOSOC).

== Mandate/Mission ==
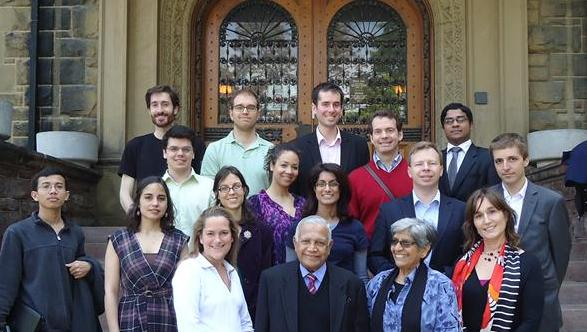
A few CISDL Members with CISDL patron H.E. Judge C.G Weeramantry, former Vice-President of the International Court of Justice, after a 2011 meeting.

The Centre for International Sustainable Development Law (CISDL) exists to promote sustainable societies and the protection of ecosystems by advancing the understanding, development and implementation of international sustainable development law.

As part of its ongoing legal scholarship and research, the CISDL publishes books, articles, working papers and legal briefs in English, Spanish and French. The CISDL hosts academic workshops, dialogue sessions, legal expert panels parallel to international negotiations, law courses and seminar series, and conferences to further its legal research agenda. It provides instructors, lecturers, and capacity-building materials for developing country governments and international organisations in national and international law in the field of sustainable development, and works with countries to develop national laws to implement international treaties in these areas.

== International Sustainable Development Law ==
Sustainable development law is at the intersection of three principal fields of international law: international economic law, international environmental law, and international social law. Sustainable development law refers to emerging substantive body of legal instruments, norms, and treaties supported by distinctive procedural elements.

In international treaty law, sustainable development is an agreed objective of many international treaties, both at the global and regional levels. As such, sustainable development can be considered part of the 'object and purpose' of a growing number of treaties and therefore directly relevant in the interpretation of their provisions. The concept appears, often as an objective or preambular reference, in most international statements and declarations related to environmental, social, and economic issues since the 1992 Rio de Janeiro Earth Summit.

In the 1992 Rio Declaration and Agenda 21, governments committed to the "further development of international law on sustainable development, giving special attention to the delicate balance between environmental and developmental concerns." Sustainable development requires accommodation, reconciliation and integration between economic growth, social justice (including human rights) and environmental protection objectives, towards participatory improvement in collective quality of life for the benefit of both present and future generations. It has also featured as an object and purpose of many international economic, social, and environmental treaties involving developed and developing countries as a concept which guides the decisions of international courts and tribunals, as well as the holdings of judges in national courts around the world.

== Governance ==
The CISDL is federally incorporated as a not-for-profit organisation in Canada since 2001, and governed by a Board of Governors. It is guided by a roster of international advisors and expert collaborators. The management of the CISDL is entrusted to the CISDL Director as well as the CISDL Secretariat, which is based in Montreal, Canada.

== Strategic Objectives ==
The objectives of the CISDL are to advance International Sustainable Development Law (ISDL) scholarship through research and analysis; build capacity, education and experience in ISDL; support the development and implementation of stronger ISDL; promote ISDL networks and knowledge dissemination, and strengthen the CISDL as an institution.

== Legal Research ==
The CISDL is engaged in six primary areas of sustainable development law research and legal analysis, each of which is led by a CISDL Lead Counsel based at a law faculty, international organisation, or firm. These CISDL programmes focus on intersections and sustainable development related laws on:

1. Trade, investment and competition

2. Natural Resources

3. Biodiversity and Biosafety

4. Climate Change

5. Human Rights and Poverty Eradication

6. Health and Hazards

7. Governance, Institutions & Accountability

The CISDL works in cooperation with a network of developing country faculties of law and collaborates closely with the Law Faculty of McGill University, the University of Cambridge Faculty of Law through the LRCIL, and the Université de Montreal through the CERIUM.

It has guidance from three Montreal-based multilateral treaty secretariats: the World Bank Legal Vice-Presidency, the United Nations Environment Programme, and the United Nations Development Programme. It maintains a memorandum of understanding with the International Institute for Sustainable Development (IISD) and the International Development Law Organisation (IDLO). Leading CISDL members serve as expert delegates on the International Law Association Committee on International Law on Sustainable Development.

With the International Law Association (ILA) and the International Development Law Organisation (IDLO), under the auspices of the United Nations Commission on Sustainable Development (UN CSD), CISDL chairs a Partnership Initiative, 'International Law for Sustainable Development' that was launched in Johannesburg at the 2002 World Summit for Sustainable Development, to build knowledge about international law on sustainable development.

== Membership ==
CISDL members include learned jurists and scholars from all regions of the world, and a diversity of legal traditions. Through a competitive annual selection process, the CISDL appoints Associate Fellows, Legal Research Fellows, and Senior Research Fellows, who are holders of all associated privileges and obligations fellowship.

== Continuing Legal Education ==
The CISDL offers, in partnership with ILA Canadian Branch, an online course in international law for lawyers seeking to accomplish Continuing Legal Education credits. The course offers 25 hours of related in-depth online training on international law which can be completed from anywhere in the world. Through a series of modules with some of Canada and the World's best international law professors and experts, the International Law course focuses on topics such as the relevance of international law in Canada, trade and investment law, climate change, and human rights.

== Sustainable Development Law Website ==
In 2011, in partnership with ILA, IDLO and LCIL, the CISDL launched a new pilot website on sustainable development law. In recent years, discussions of the role of international law in sustainable development have expanded considerably, the concept of sustainable development is increasingly being invoked before nations and international courts and tribunals worldwide. With this project, the CISDL sought to develop a tool for researchers around the world studying the legal dimension of sustainable development. This on-line analytical tool comprises a dynamic database of decisions from international courts and tribunals that have referred to, or used, the concept-objective of sustainable development, and related international legal principles. It also includes direct links to the decisions from economic, social and human rights and international public law courts and tribunals that have applied sustainable development principles in the resolution of disputes between 1992 and 2012.
