= Federal Appendix =

Federal appellate case law reporter (2001–2021)

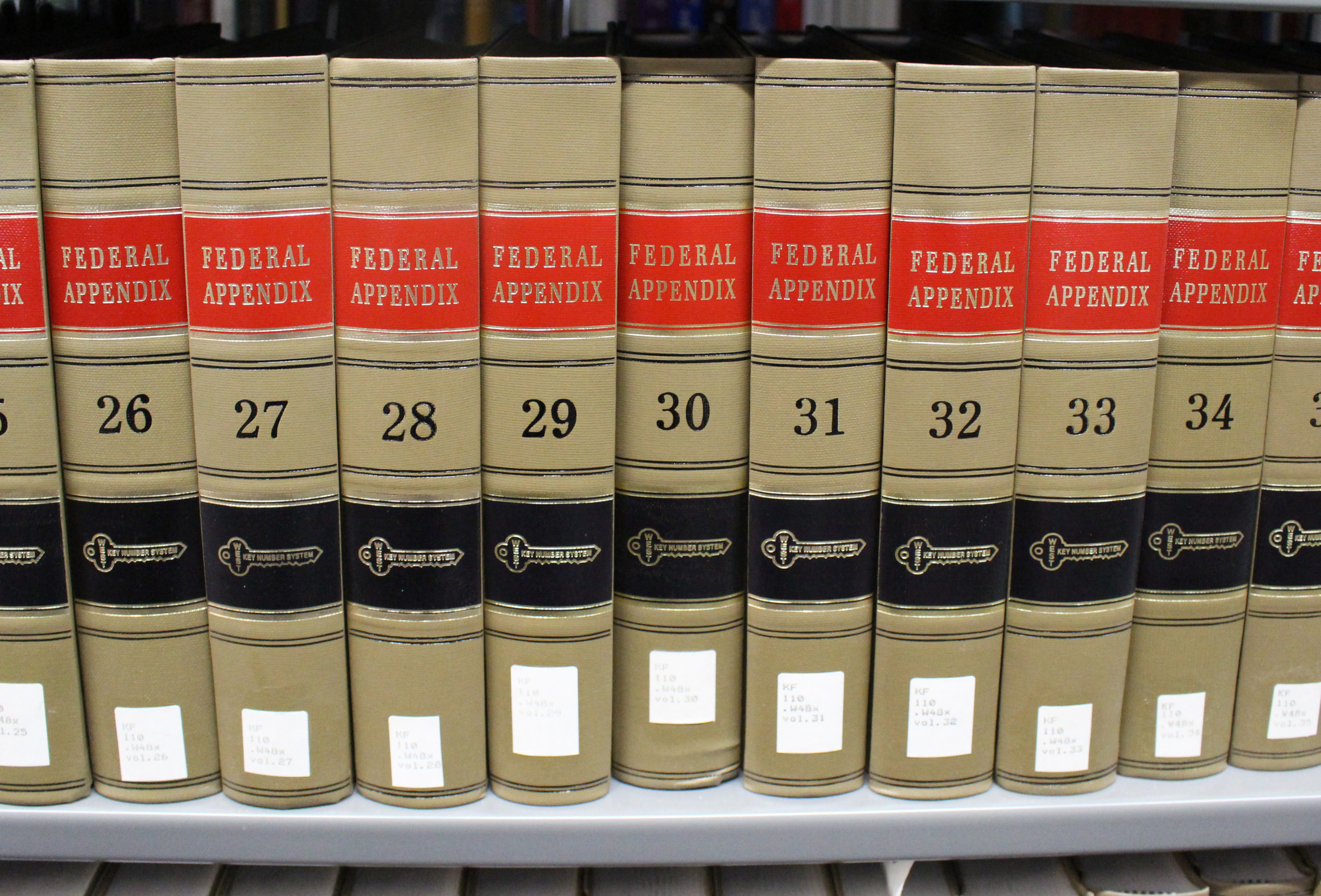
The Federal Appendix

The Federal Appendix was a case law reporter published by West Publishing from 2001 to 2021. It collected judicial opinions of the United States courts of appeals that were not expressly selected or designated for publication. Such "unpublished" cases are ostensibly without value as precedent. However, the Supreme Court made a change to the Federal Rules of Appellate Procedure in 2006. Now, Rule 32.1 says that federal circuit courts are not allowed to prohibit the citation of unpublished opinions issued on or after January 1, 2007. Nevertheless, principles articulated in an opinion designated as "not for publication" are treated by the judges of that circuit as not necessarily binding on future panels hearing similar cases, nor on the district judges within the circuit.

"Published" opinions of the U.S. courts of appeals appear in the Federal Reporter and are considered to be binding precedent within that circuit until and unless overruled by the court of appeals sitting en banc, or by the Supreme Court of the United States.

Opinions of all the circuits of the United States courts of appeals are included in the Federal Appendix. The Federal Appendix organizes court opinions within each volume by the date of the decision, and includes the full text of the court's opinion. West attorney editors add headnotes that summarize key principles of law in the cases, and Key Numbers that classify the decisions by topic within the West American Digest System. The Bluebook calls for citations to the Federal Appendix to be abbreviated as F. App'x. Westlaw, however, abbreviates citations to the Federal Appendix as Fed. Appx.

861 hardbound volumes of the Federal Appendix were issued. Publication of Federal Appendix ceased in 2021, but nonprecedential United States courts of appeals opinions are still available on Westlaw, LexisNexis, and other on-line resources.

There is debate within the legal community about the desirability or even the legitimacy of designating certain judicial opinions as without precedential value.
