= Federal Rules Decisions =

Case law reporter series

Federal Rules Decisions is a case law reporter in the United States that is published by West Publishing as part of the National Reporter System. The Federal Rules Decisions series publishes decisions of the United States district courts involving the Federal Rules of Civil Procedure, Federal Rules of Criminal Procedure, Federal Rules of Appellate Procedure, and Federal Rules of Evidence that are not published in the Federal Supplement. In addition, articles commenting on those topics are published, along with proposed rules changes.
