= Hawley v. Diller =

- Supreme Court of the United States

Decided May 28, 1900
- Full case name: Ravaud K. Hawley et al., Appellants, v. L. Edgar Diller
- Citations: 178 U.S. 476 (more) 20 S. Ct. 986; 44 L. Ed. 1157

Case history
- Prior: Appeal from a decree of the Court of Appeals for the Ninth Circuit

Holding
- Purchasers from an entryman under the Timber and Stone Act of 1878 acquire only an equitable interest, not legal title, prior to the issuance of a patent by the United States. Purchasers, therefore, are not protected against cancellation of the original entry for fraud or violation of the Act allowing the Land Department to cancel such an entry before patent issuance and issue a new patent to another party.

Court membership
- Chief Justice Melville Fuller Associate Justices John M. Harlan · Horace Gray; David J. Brewer · Henry B. Brown; George Shiras Jr. · Edward D. White; Rufus W. Peckham · Joseph McKenna

Case opinion
- Majority: Harlan, joined by unanimous

Laws applied
- Timber and Stone Act of 1878

Hawley v. Diller, 178 U.S. 476 (1900), is a decision of the Supreme Court of the United States. The primary issue was the Timber and Stone Act of 1878, which allowed the equivalent of homesteading on land suitable for logging and quarrying. The Supreme Court held that the government had validly rescinded an earlier grant of property, and Hawley and his colitigants were not protected under the act's bona fide purchaser protection. The case is notable, however, for its inclusion of an apparently erroneous syllabus.

== Background and holding ==
In order to claim land under the act, one had to swear that the land was "valuable chiefly for timber, but unfit for cultivation," and that the claim was not for speculation. A man had made a timberland entry under the act in the then Territory of Washington, but sold it the same day he received his certificate to a man who in turned sold it to a group of buyers, including Hawley. The Land Department subsequently suspended the original entry and investigation showed the land was suitable for farming, not logging, and that the claim was speculative. Diller was a subsequent applicant who received a patent to the land, and Hawley and others sued claiming their rights had been unjustly terminated. The act did protect a "bona fide purchaser," which Hawley argued prohibited the cancellation of the original entry. But the Court held that Hawley and his colitigants were not bona fide purchasers.

At the most, it is but an equitable title, the legal title being in the government. It is a familiar rule that the purchaser of an equitable title takes and holds it subject to all equities upon it in the hands of the vendor, and has no better standing than he.

The case's syllabus summarized that holding as, "An entryman under this act acquires only an equity, and a purchaser from him cannot be regarded as a bona fide purchaser within the meaning of the act of Congress unless he become such after the government, by issuing a patent, has parted with the legal title."

== Later Reliance on the Erroneous Syllabus ==
Years later, attorneys for the United States relied on the syllabus's holding that a purchaser was not protected until a patent was issued in United States v. Detroit Timber & Lumber Company, 200 U.S. 321 (1906). However, the Court noted that the syllabus was not binding and was, apparently, erroneous. While a purchaser only holds equitable title until a patent is issued, that does not mean he cannot be a bona fide purchaser. Indeed, Detroit Timber was found to be a bona fide purchaser in that case.

The Court's admonition in that case has resulted in all syllabi issued by the Supreme Court now including a paragraph of boilerplate text to warn readers not to rely on the syllabus for the actual meaning of the decision.

NOTE: Where it is feasible, a syllabus (headnote) will be released, as is being done in connection with this case, at the time the opinion is issued. The syllabus constitutes no part of the opinion of the Court but has been prepared by the Reporter of Decisions for the convenience of the reader. See United States v. Detroit Timber & Lumber Co., 200 U. S. 321, 337.
