= State Bar Association of North Dakota =

Bar Association

- Type: Legal Society
- Headquarters: Bismarck, ND
- Location: United States
- Members: 2,065 in 2012 (550 out of state)
- Website: http://www.sband.org/

The State Bar Association of North Dakota (SBAND) is the integrated (mandatory) bar association of the U.S. state of North Dakota.

== History ==
Founded in 1899, SBAND is the oldest integrated bar association in the United States.

== Structure ==
The SBAND is governed by a Board of Governors, consisting of 6 member and 4 officers.

The Association provides a wide range of services, including

- CLE programs
- ethics opinions
- a lawyers assistance program
- Casemaker
- insurance programs
- client protection funds
- consumer protection against the unauthorized practice of law.

Association committees actively address issues involving judicial qualifications, public information programs, and law-related education in the public school system. Association staff also administer programs sponsored by the North Dakota Bar Foundation, the philanthropic arm of the Association funds several local projects which focus on providing information to North Dakota citizens regarding the administration of justice. In addition, the Foundation is responsible for administering the Interest on Lawyer Trust Account Program (IOLTA). The IOLTA program provides grant monies to programs providing civil legal services to the poor and other programs which facilitate individuals efforts to obtain representation in the court system. SBAND enforces the rule that North Dakota lawyers must complete 45 credits of Continuing Legal Education every 3 years.

SBAND publishes the Monthly Gavel.
