= Southern Reporter =

Regional case law reporter in the United States

The Southern Reporter, the Southern Reporter Second, and the Southern Reporter Third are United States regional case law reporters. It is part of the National Reporter System created by John B. West for the West Publishing Company.

National Reporter System regions

The Southern Reporter contains published appellate court case decisions for:

- Alabama
- Florida
- Louisiana
- Mississippi

When cited, the Southern Reporter, the Southern Reporter Second, and the Southern Reporter Third are abbreviated "So.", "So. 2d", and "So. 3d", respectively, and are based on the years of case law it covers. The first edition contains decisions and opinions from the years 1887 to 1941, while the second accounts for 1941 to 2008 and the third ranges from 2008 to present.
