= South Western Reporter =

Law reporters in US

The South Western Reporter, South Western Reporter Second, and South Western Reporter Third are United States regional case law reporters. It is part of the National Reporter System created by John B. West for West Publishing Company, which is now part of Thomson Reuters.

National Reporter System regions

The South Western Reporter contains published appellate court case decisions for:

- Arkansas
- Kentucky
- Missouri
- Tennessee
- Texas

When cited, the South Western Reporter, South Western Reporter Second, and South Western Reporter Third are abbreviated "S.W.", "S.W.2d", and "S.W.3d", respectively.
