= List of United States Supreme Court cases, volume 200 =

Supreme Court of the United States
- Interactive map of Supreme Court of the United States
- 38°53′26″N 77°00′16″W
- Established: March 4, 1789; 236 years ago
- Location: Washington, D.C.
- Coordinates: 38°53′26″N 77°00′16″W
- Composition method: Presidential nomination with Senate confirmation
- Authorised by: Constitution of the United States, Art. III, § 1
- Judge term length: life tenure, subject to impeachment and removal
- Number of positions: 9 (by statute)
- Website: supremecourt.gov

This is a list of cases reported in volume 200 of United States Reports, decided by the Supreme Court of the United States in 1906.

== Justices of the Supreme Court at the time of volume 200 U.S. ==
The Supreme Court is established by Article III, Section 1 of the Constitution of the United States, which says: "The judicial Power of the United States, shall be vested in one supreme Court . . .". The size of the Court is not specified; the Constitution leaves it to Congress to set the number of justices. Under the Judiciary Act of 1789 Congress originally fixed the number of justices at six (one chief justice and five associate justices). Since 1789 Congress has varied the size of the Court from six to seven, nine, ten, and back to nine justices (always including one chief justice).

When the cases in volume 200 were decided the Court comprised the following nine members:

Portrait	Justice	Office	Home State	Succeeded	Date confirmed by the Senate (Vote)	Tenure on Supreme Court
	Melville Fuller	Chief Justice	Illinois	Morrison Waite	July 20, 1888 (41–20)	October 8, 1888 – July 4, 1910 (Died)
	John Marshall Harlan	Associate Justice	Kentucky	David Davis	November 29, 1877 (Acclamation)	December 10, 1877 – October 14, 1911 (Died)
	David Josiah Brewer	Associate Justice	Kansas	Stanley Matthews	December 18, 1889 (53–11)	January 6, 1890 – March 28, 1910 (Died)
	Henry Billings Brown	Associate Justice	Michigan	Samuel Freeman Miller	December 29, 1890 (Acclamation)	January 5, 1891 – May 28, 1906 (Retired)
	Edward Douglass White	Associate Justice	Louisiana	Samuel Blatchford	February 19, 1894 (Acclamation)	March 12, 1894 – December 18, 1910 (Continued as chief justice)
	Rufus W. Peckham	Associate Justice	New York	Howell Edmunds Jackson	December 9, 1895 (Acclamation)	January 6, 1896 – October 24, 1909 (Died)
	Joseph McKenna	Associate Justice	California	Stephen Johnson Field	January 21, 1898 (Acclamation)	January 26, 1898 – January 5, 1925 (Retired)
	Oliver Wendell Holmes Jr.	Associate Justice	Massachusetts	Horace Gray	December 4, 1902 (Acclamation)	December 8, 1902 – January 12, 1932 (Retired)
	William R. Day	Associate Justice	Ohio	George Shiras Jr.	February 23, 1903 (Acclamation)	March 2, 1903 – November 13, 1922 (Retired)

== Notable Case in 200 U.S. ==
=== United States v. Detroit Timber & Lumber Co. ===
In United States v. Detroit Timber & Lumber Co., 200 U.S. 321 (1906), the primary issue to the parties was ownership of 44 tracts of timberland, however, the case has become the standard reference to warn attorneys not to rely on the syllabus of a reported case as opposed to the text of the decision itself, since the syllabus is not written by the Supreme Court but by its Reporter of Decisions.

== Citation style ==
Under the Judiciary Act of 1789 the federal court structure at the time comprised District Courts, which had general trial jurisdiction; Circuit Courts, which had mixed trial and appellate (from the US District Courts) jurisdiction; and the United States Supreme Court, which had appellate jurisdiction over the federal District and Circuit courts—and for certain issues over state courts. The Supreme Court also had limited original jurisdiction (i.e., in which cases could be filed directly with the Supreme Court without first having been heard by a lower federal or state court). There were one or more federal District Courts and/or Circuit Courts in each state, territory, or other geographical region.

The Judiciary Act of 1891 created the United States Courts of Appeals and reassigned the jurisdiction of most routine appeals from the district and circuit courts to these appellate courts. The Act created nine new courts that were originally known as the "United States Circuit Courts of Appeals." The new courts had jurisdiction over most appeals of lower court decisions. The Supreme Court could review either legal issues that a court of appeals certified or decisions of court of appeals by writ of certiorari.

Bluebook citation style is used for case names, citations, and jurisdictions.

- "# Cir." = United States Court of Appeals
  - e.g., "3d Cir." = United States Court of Appeals for the Third Circuit
- "C.C.D." = United States Circuit Court for the District of . . .
  - e.g.,"C.C.D.N.J." = United States Circuit Court for the District of New Jersey
- "D." = United States District Court for the District of . . .
  - e.g.,"D. Mass." = United States District Court for the District of Massachusetts
- "E." = Eastern; "M." = Middle; "N." = Northern; "S." = Southern; "W." = Western
  - e.g.,"C.C.S.D.N.Y." = United States Circuit Court for the Southern District of New York
  - e.g.,"M.D. Ala." = United States District Court for the Middle District of Alabama
- "Ct. Cl." = United States Court of Claims
- The abbreviation of a state's name alone indicates the highest appellate court in that state's judiciary at the time.
  - e.g.,"Pa." = Supreme Court of Pennsylvania
  - e.g.,"Me." = Supreme Judicial Court of Maine

== List of cases in volume 200 U.S. ==
Case Name	Page and year	Opinion of the Court	Concurring opinion(s)	Dissenting opinion(s)	Lower Court	Disposition
United States ex rel. Drury v. Lewis	1 (1906)	Fuller	none	none	C.C.W.D. Pa.	affirmed
Albright v. New Mexico ex rel. Sandoval	9 (1906)	Fuller	none	none	Sup. Ct. Terr. N.M.	affirmed
Nutt v. Knut	12 (1906)	Harlan	none	none	Miss.	affirmed
Knoxville Water Company v. City of Knoxville	22 (1906)	Harlan	none	none	C.C.E.D. Tenn.	affirmed
Owensboro Waterworks Company v. City of Owensboro	38 (1906)	Harlan	none	none	C.C.W.D. Ky.	affirmed
Peoria Gas and Electric Company v. City of Peoria	48 (1906)	Brewer	none	none	C.C.N.D. Ill.	reversed
Guaranty Trust and Deposit Company v. Fisher	57 (1906)	Brewer	none	none	4th Cir.	affirmed
Howard v. Perrin	71 (1906)	Brewer	none	none	Sup. Ct. Terr. Ariz.	affirmed
Kolze v. Hoadley	76 (1906)	Brown	none	none	C.C.N.D. Ill.	reversed
Campbell v. California	87 (1906)	White	none	none	Cal.	affirmed
Herrick v. Boquillas Land and Cattle Company	96 (1906)	White	none	none	Sup. Ct. Terr. Ariz.	affirmed
Serralles Succession v. Esbri	103 (1906)	Peckham	none	none	P.R.	reversed
Montana Catholic Missions v. Missoula County	118 (1906)	Peckham	none	none	C.C.D. Mont.	affirmed
Speer v. Colbert	130 (1906)	Peckham	none	none	D.C. Cir.	affirmed
Mead v. City of Portland	148 (1906)	McKenna	none	none	Or.	affirmed
Howard v. Kentucky	164 (1906)	McKenna	Harlan	none	Ky.	affirmed
Louisville and Nashville Railroad Company v. Deer	176 (1906)	Holmes	none	none	Ala.	reversed
Cincinnati et al. Company v. Bay	179 (1906)	Holmes	none	none	Ohio	affirmed
Ballmann v. Fagin	186 (1906)	Holmes	none	none	C.C.S.D. Ohio	affirmed
United States ex rel. Hill v. American Surety Company of New York	197 (1906)	Day	none	none	Wash. Super. Ct.	reversed
Alabama Great Southern Railroad Company v. Thompson	206 (1906)	Day	none	none	6th Cir.	certification
Cincinnati, New Orleans and Texas Pacific Railway Company v. Bohon	221 (1906)	Day	none	none	Ky.	affirmed
Armour Packing Company v. Lacy	226 (1906)	Fuller	none	Brown	N.C.	affirmed
Hallenborg v. Cobre Grande Copper Company	239 (1906)	McKenna	none	none	Sup. Ct. Terr. Ariz.	affirmed
Graham v. Folsom	248 (1906)	McKenna	none	none	C.C.D.S.C.	affirmed
Carter v. Hawaii	255 (1906)	Holmes	none	none	Sup. Ct. Terr. Haw.	reversed
Warner v. Grayson	257 (1906)	Day	none	none	D.C. Cir.	affirmed
Gunter v. Atlantic Coast Line Railroad Company	273 (1906)	White	none	none	C.C.D.S.C.	affirmed
Carfer v. Caldwell	293 (1906)	Fuller	none	none	C.C.N.D.W. Va.	reversed
Guss v. Nelson	298 (1906)	Brewer	none	none	Sup. Ct. Terr. Okla.	affirmed
San Antonio Traction Company v. Altgelt	304 (1906)	Brown	none	none	Tex. Civ. App.	affirmed
Hibernia Savings and Loan Society v. City of San Francisco	310 (1906)	Brown	none	none	Cal.	affirmed
Martin v. Texas	316 (1906)	Harlan	none	none	Tex. Crim. App.	affirmed
United States v. Detroit Timber and Lumber Company	321 (1906)	Brewer	none	none	8th Cir.	affirmed
Southern Pacific Railroad Company v. United States I	341 (1906)	Brewer	none	none	9th Cir.	affirmed
Southern Pacific Railroad Company v. United States II	354 (1906)	Brewer	none	none	9th Cir.	affirmed
New York, New Haven and Hartford Railroad Company v. Interstate Commerce Commission	361 (1906)	White	none	none	C.C.W.D. Va.	affirmed
Rector v. City Deposit Bank Company	405 (1906)	White	none	none	Ohio	reversed
Rector v. Commercial National Bank	420 (1906)	White	none	none	Ohio	reversed
First National Bank v. Converse	425 (1906)	White	Harlan	Brewer	C.C.N.D. Ill.	reversed
Security Mutual Life Insurance Company v. Prewitt	446 (1906)	Peckham	none	none	Ky.	dismissed
Travelers Insurance Company v. Prewitt	450 (1906)	Peckham	none	none	Ky.	dismissed
United States v. Bitter Root Development Company	451 (1906)	Peckham	none	none	9th Cir.	affirmed
Looney v. Metropolitan Railroad Company	480 (1906)	McKenna	none	none	D.C. Cir.	affirmed
United States v. New York et al. Company	488 (1906)	McKenna	none	none	S.D.N.Y.	reversed
Missouri v. Illinois	496 (1906)	Holmes	none	none	original	dismissed
Strickley v. Highland Boy Gold Mining Company	527 (1906)	Holmes	none	none	Utah	affirmed
Whitney v. Dresser	532 (1906)	Holmes	none	none	2d Cir.	affirmed
Southern Pacific Railroad Company v. Interstate Commerce Commission	536 (1906)	Peckham	none	none	C.C.S.D. Cal.	reversed
Chicago, Burlington and Quincy Railroad Company v. Illinois ex rel. Commissioners	561 (1906)	Harlan	Holmes	Brewer	Ill.	affirmed
United States v. Clark	601 (1906)	Holmes	McKenna	none	9th Cir.	affirmed

== See also ==
- Certificate of division
