= North Eastern Reporter =

Regional case law reporter

The North Eastern Reporter, North Eastern Reporter Second, and North Eastern Reporter Third (ISSN 0275-262X) are United States regional case-law reporters. Collectively, the North Eastern Reporter is part of the National Reporter System created by John B. West for West Publishing Company, which is now part of Thomson West.

National Reporter System regions

The North Eastern Reporter contains published U.S.-state appellate court case decisions for:

- Illinois
- Indiana
- Massachusetts
- New York
- Ohio

When cited, the North Eastern Reporter, North Eastern Reporter Second, and North Eastern Reporter Third are abbreviated "N.E.", "N.E.2d" and "N.E.3d", respectively.
