= Scots Law Times =

Law reports service and magazine in Scotland

The Scots Law Times is a commercially published law reports service and law magazine for Scotland, publishing over 1400 pages of reports each year. Published weekly during court term by W. Green, the Scots Law Times covers every Scottish court, civil and criminal, from the Sheriff Courts to the Supreme Court of the United Kingdom (formerly the House of Lords).

It is considered the most authoritative series of law reports in Scotland, after the Sessions Cases.

Since 2000, the Scots Law Times reports have been prepared by a specialist legal team working online, with court opinions downloaded from the Scottish Court Service website. Reports of leading cases can therefore be published very shortly after a decision is issued.

The Scots Law Times also has a news section that contains topical articles, reviews of recent publications, case commentaries, and new rules of court and practice notes.

== See also ==
- List of leading Scottish legal cases
