= Ex parte McQuillon =

- Court: United States District Court for the Southern District of New York
- Full case name: Ex parte Purcell McQuillon
- Decided: August 5, 1861
- Citation: 16 F. Cas. 347

Court membership
- Judge sitting: Samuel Betts

Ex parte McQuillon, 16 F. Cas. 347 (1861), was a case decided in August 1861 by the United States District Court for the Southern District of New York involving a writ of habeas corpus. Judge Samuel Betts issued the writ for Purcell McQuillon, who was being held in military custody at Fort Lafayette, but the commandant of the fort declined to bring McQuillon before the court as demanded, citing an order from Gen. Winfield Scott. Over the objection of McQuillon's attorney, Judge Betts issued no opinion on the case, declaring that it would be indecorous to openly disagree with Chief Justice Taney's reasoning in ex parte Merryman, but that the Constitution must be defended in whatever way it can be and the public would not want everyone to have access to habeas corpus during the Civil War.
