= Alwin v. State Farm Fire & Casualty Co. =

Case decided by the Wisconsin Court of Appeals

Alwin v. State Farm Fire and Casualty Co.
- Court: Wisconsin Court of Appeals
- Full case name: JoAnn R. Alwin and Walter F. Alwin v. State Farm Fire and Casualty Company
- Decided: March 28, 2000
- Citations: 610 N.W.2d 218 (Wis. Ct. App. 2000); 234 Wis.2d 441 (2000)

Case history
- Subsequent action: 237 Wis.2d 253 (2000) (denied review)

Court membership
- Judges sitting: Thomas R. Cane; Michael W. Hoover; Gregory A. Peterson; Raymond F. Thums

Case opinions
- Unanimous opinion by Cane

Alwin v. State Farm Fire and Casualty Co., 610 N.W.2d 218 (Wis. Ct. App. 2000), was a case decided by the Wisconsin Court of Appeals that provided an exception to the statutory strict liability of dog owners for injuries caused by their dogs.

== Decision ==
The plaintiff (the defendant's mother) tripped over the defendant's dog and sustained injuries. The Wisconsin civil code §174.02 holds dog owners strictly liable for all injuries caused by their dogs, and this theoretically allowed recovery in this case. The court, however, ruled that as a matter of public policy the defendant should not be held liable for someone tripping over their dog.

== Subsequent history ==
Review was denied by the Wisconsin Supreme Court on May 23, 2000.

== Impact ==
Alwin has been cited as an example of case-by-case consideration of tort claims that avoids inequitable results that might follow the blind application of strict formulations of liability.
