= Pacific Reporter =

Case law reporter

The Pacific Reporter, Pacific Reporter Second, and Pacific Reporter Third (ISSN 1044-9442) are United States regional case law reporters. It is part of the National Reporter System created by John B. West for West Publishing Company, which is now part of Thomson West.

National Reporter System regions

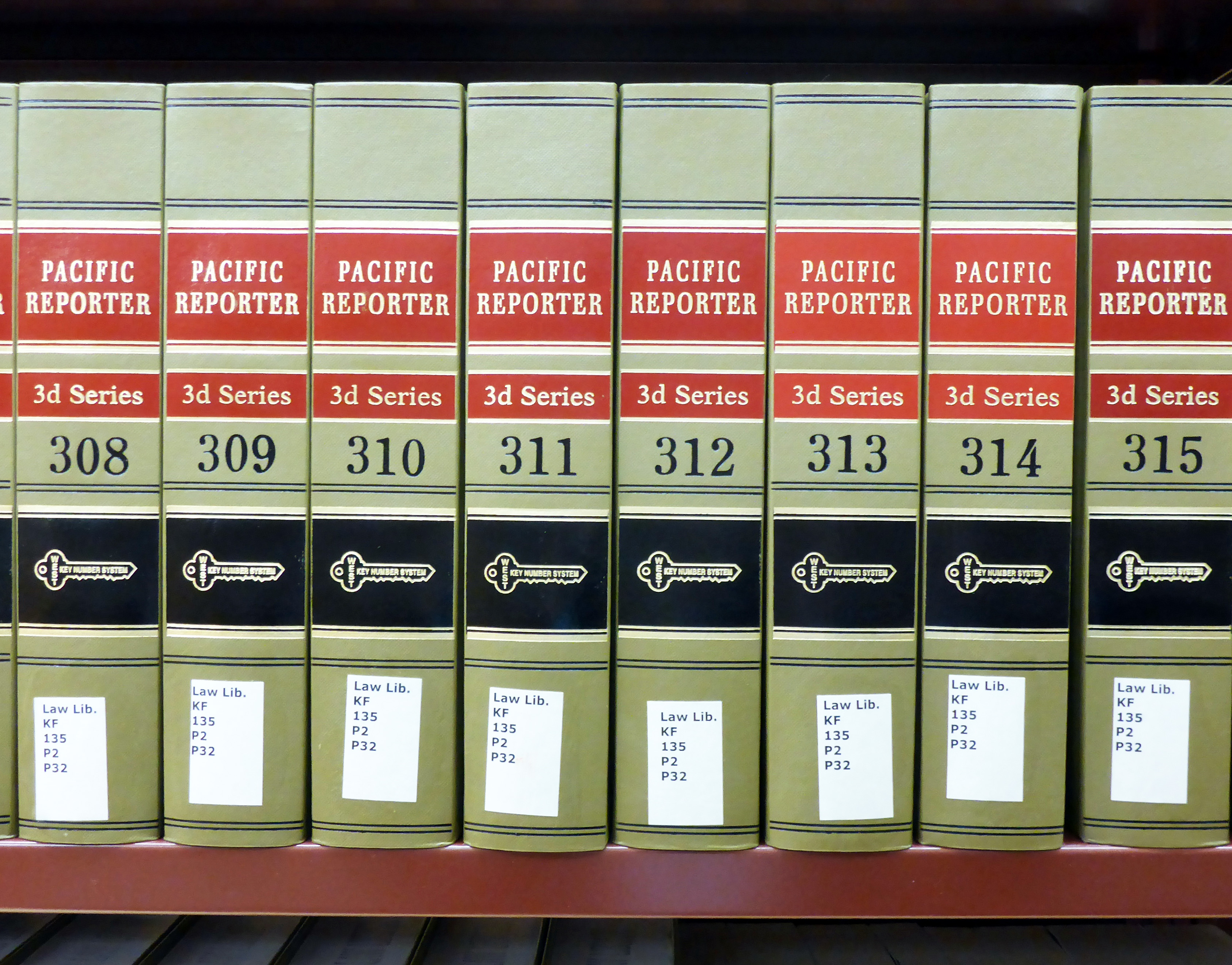
Pacific Reporter volumes on the shelf at a law library

The Pacific Reporter contains published appellate court case decisions for:

- Alaska
- Arizona
- California
- Colorado
- Hawaii
- Idaho
- Kansas
- Montana
- Nevada
- New Mexico
- Oklahoma
- Oregon
- Utah
- Washington
- Wyoming

When cited, the Pacific Reporter, Pacific Reporter Second, and Pacific Reporter Third are abbreviated "P.", "P.2d", and "P.3d", respectively.

== Date ranges ==
The first Pacific Reporter series only had 300 volumes, and spanned from January 1883 to June 1931 (1 P. 1 to 300 P. 1119). The second series, with 999 volumes, covered June 1931 to March 2000 (1 P.2d 1 to 999 P.2d 1310). The third series began in May 2000 with 1 P.3d 1.
