= Federal Supplement =

American case law reporter that compiles opinions of the U.S. District Courts

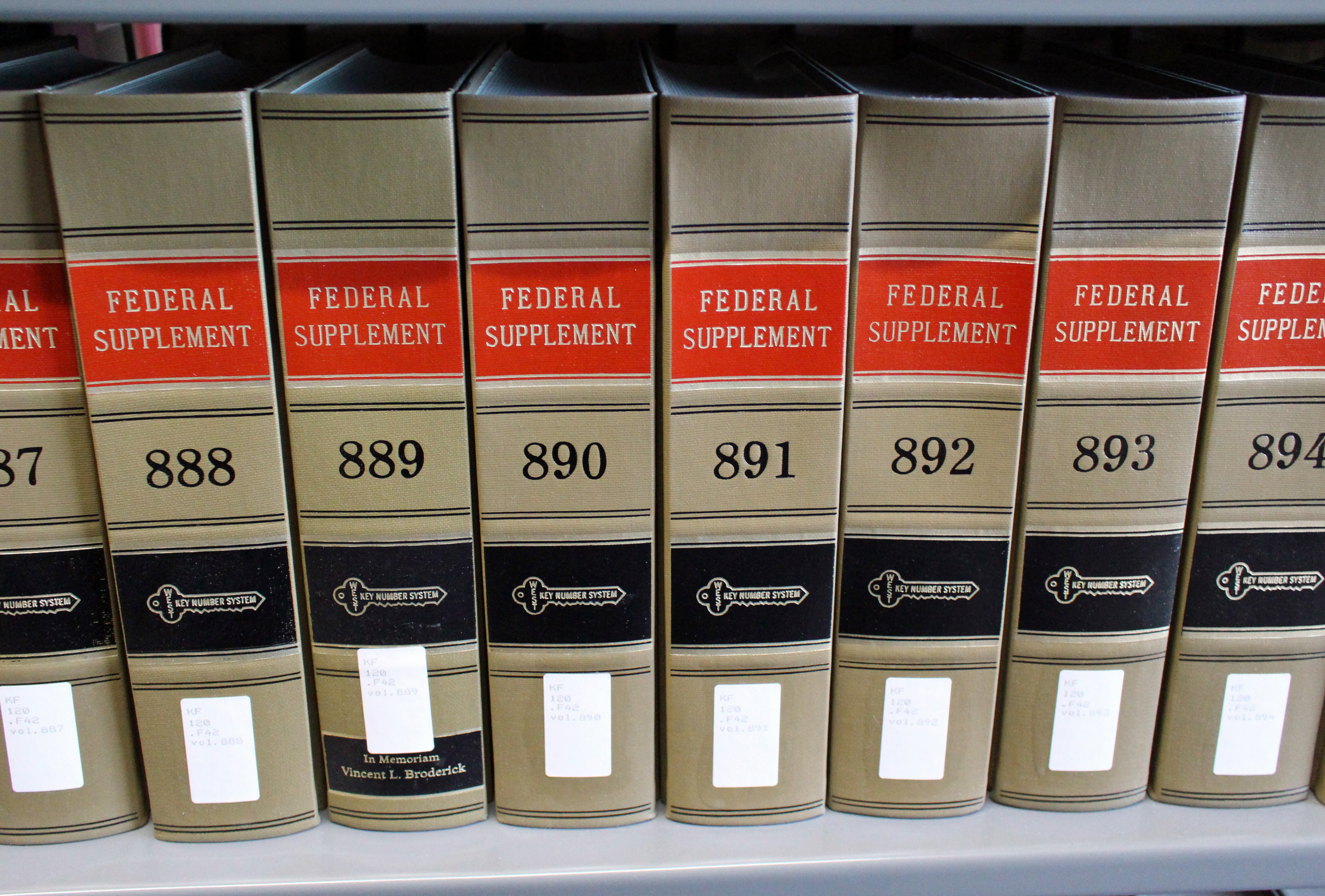
The Federal Supplement

The Federal Supplement (ISSN 1047-7306) is a case law reporter published by West Publishing in the United States that includes select opinions of the United States district courts since 1932, and is part of the National Reporter System. Although the Federal Supplement is an unofficial reporter and West is a private company that does not have a legal monopoly over the court opinions it publishes, it has so dominated the industry in the U.S. that legal professionals uniformly cite the Federal Supplement for included decisions. Approximately 40 new volumes are published per year.

== Distinctions ==
Before 1932, federal district court cases were published in the Federal Reporter, which now publishes only case law from the United States Courts of Appeals and the United States Court of Federal Claims; prior series had varying scopes that covered opinions of other federal courts as well. The United States Reports are the official law reports of the rulings, orders, case tables, and other proceedings of the Supreme Court of the United States.

== Features and print format ==
The Federal Supplement organizes court opinions within each volume by the date of the decision, and includes the full official text of the court's opinion. West editors add headnotes that summarize key principles of law in the cases, and Key Numbers that classify the decisions by topic within the West American Digest System.

Although opinions designated by the courts as "for publication" or "publish" are included in the Federal Supplement, West editors also select certain opinions without such a designation for publication, as part of West's editorial process. Opinions explicitly designated "not for publication" will not be selected.

== Stare Decisis and Precedent ==
Unlike the "published" opinions of the United States Courts of Appeals—which are included in the Federal Reporter series and have full precedential value, binding the lower courts in the relevant judicial circuit (vertical stare decisis) and, to a lesser degree, the issuing Court of Appeals (horizontal stare decisis)—published district court opinions do not constitute binding precedent. They may, however, be viewed as more persuasive than unpublished opinions.

== Series ==
=== Federal Supplement ===
Citation: F. Supp.
Published: 1933–1998
Volumes: 999
Courts covered:
- United States district courts (previously found in the Federal Reporter, also published by West)
- United States Customs Court (United States Court of International Trade, 1980–onward)
- Judicial Panel on Multidistrict Litigation

=== Federal Supplement, Second Series ===
Citation: F. Supp. 2d
Published: 1998–2014
Volumes: 999
Courts covered:
- United States district courts
- United States Court of Federal Claims
- United States Court of International Trade
- Judicial Panel on Multidistrict Litigation

=== Federal Supplement, Third Series ===
Citation: F. Supp. 3d
Published: 2014–present
Volumes: 633 (As of August 2023)
Courts covered:
- United States district courts
- United States Court of Federal Claims
- United States Court of International Trade
- Judicial Panel on Multidistrict Litigation

== Electronic sources ==
The Federal Supplement, including its supplementary material, is also available on CD-ROM compilations, and on West's online legal database, Westlaw. Because individual court cases are identified by case citations that consist of printed page and volume numbers, the electronic text of the opinions incorporates the page numbers of the printed volumes with "star pagination" formatting—the numbers are boldfaced within brackets and with asterisks prepended (i.e., [*4]) to stand out from the rest of the text.

Though West has copyright over its original headnotes and keynotes, the opinions themselves are public domain and accordingly may be found in other sources, chiefly Lexis, Westlaw's competitor. Lexis also copies the star paginated Federal Supplement numbering in their text of the opinions to allow for proper citation, a practice that was the subject of an unsuccessful copyright lawsuit by West against the parent company of Lexis.
