= South Eastern Reporter =

Regional case law reporter

The South Eastern Reporter and South Eastern Reporter Second are United States regional case law reporters. It is part of the National Reporter System created by John B. West for West Publishing Company, which is now part of Thomson West.

National Reporter System regions

The South Eastern Reports contains published appellate court case decisions for:

- Georgia
- North Carolina
- South Carolina
- Virginia
- West Virginia

When cited, the South Eastern Reporter and South Eastern Reporter Second are abbreviated "S.E." and "S.E.2d", respectively.
