= Lawyers' Edition =

Reporter of US Supreme Court opinions

The United States Supreme Court Reports, Lawyers' Edition, or Lawyers' Edition (L. Ed. and L. Ed. 2d in case citations), is an unofficial reporter of Supreme Court of the United States opinions. The Lawyers' Edition was established by the Lawyers Cooperative Publishing Company of Rochester, New York in 1882, and features coverage of Supreme Court decisions going back to 1790. The first Lawyers' Edition series corresponds to the official United States Reports from volume 1 to volume 351, whereas the second series contains cases starting from the official reporter volume 352. It is currently published by LexisNexis.

The Lawyers' Edition differs from the official reporter in that the editors write headnotes and case summaries, as well as provide annotations to some cases, and decisions are published far in advance of the official reporter. As such, it is similar to West's unofficial Supreme Court Reporter (S. Ct.). Lawyers' Edition case reports differ from Supreme Court Reporter case reports in three respects. First, coverage in Supreme Court Reporter does not begin until Johnson v. Waters, 108 U.S. 4 (1882), while Lawyers' Edition covers opinions back to the first volume of United States Reports. Second, while both reporters contain headnotes written by the reporters' editors, the Lawyers' Edition headnotes are not keyed to the West American Digest System's topic and key number system. Third, Lawyers' Edition historically included analytical articles, referred to as "annotations", similar to those contained in American Law Reports; these annotations were eventually discontinued.

International Thomson Organization acquired Lawyers Cooperative Publishing in 1989, shortly before it merged with Thomson Newspapers to become the Thomson Corporation. LexisNexis (parent of the Michie Company) acquired the rights to the Lawyers' Edition, along with a number of other law publications and related assets, from the Thomson Corporation in January 1997. Thomson, in acquiring West Publishing, was required to divest itself of many titles through a consent decree by the United States Department of Justice.
