= John Briggs West =

American publisher

John Briggs West (August 6, 1852 – March 14, 1922) was an American publisher who founded West Publishing.

== Early life ==
John Briggs West was born in Roxbury, Massachusetts, on August 6, 1852. He had four siblings, including a brother, Horatio. His parents were William Carter, a bookkeeper, and Louisa Phoebe West.

== Career ==
In 1870, at the age of 18, West, who was neither a lawyer nor a college graduate, began work as a salesman for the D.D. Merrill Book Store in Saint Paul, Minnesota. Among other books, the store sold law books and West became aware of frontier lawyers' dissatisfaction with the quality and availability of legal publications. In 1872, West went into business for himself as "John B. West, Publisher and Book Seller", reprinting legal treatises, publishing legal forms, and producing a much-appreciated index to the Minnesota statutes.

In 1899, he abruptly left the West Publishing Company and began a competing law publisher, the Keefe-Davidson Law Book Company. He made disparaging remarks about the West key-number digest system, and within a decade his new company lost a major lawsuit and was soon out of business. He retired to southern California.

== Death ==
He died March 14, 1922, and was buried at the Oakland Cemetery in Saint Paul.
