= United States v. Detroit Timber & Lumber Co. =

United States v. Detroit Timber and Lumber Company
- Supreme Court of the United States

Argued December 7, 1905 Decided February 19, 1906
- Full case name: United States, appellant, v. Detroit Timber and Lumber Company, et al.; and Martin-Alexander Lumber Company, et al. appellants, v. United States
- Citations: 200 U.S. 321 (more) 26 S. Ct. 282; 50 L. Ed. 499

Case history
- Prior: Cross-Appeal from the Court of Appeals for the Eighth Circuit

Holding
- The headnotes to opinions of the Supreme Court are not the work of the Court but are simply the work of the Reporter of Decisions, giving his understanding of the decision, prepared for the convenience of the legal profession.

Court membership
- Chief Justice Melville Fuller Associate Justices John M. Harlan · David J. Brewer; Henry B. Brown · Edward D. White; Rufus W. Peckham · Joseph McKenna; Oliver W. Holmes Jr. · William R. Day

Case opinions
- Majority: Brewer, joined by Fuller, Brown, White, Peckham, Holmes, Day
- Dissent: Harlan
- Dissent: McKenna

Laws applied
- Timber Act of June 3, 1878

United States v. Detroit Timber & Lumber Company, 200 U.S. 321 (1906), is a decision of the Supreme Court of the United States. Although the primary issue to the parties of the case was to determine ownership of 44 tracts of timberland, the case has become the standard reference to warn attorneys not to rely on the syllabus of a reported case.

Prior to Detroit Timber, the Reporter of Decisions had mischaracterized the holding of Hawley v. Diller (1900) in its syllabus for that case. The attorneys representing the United States in Detroit Timber relied on the Hawley syllabus (which incorrectly reported the case) rather than the text of the actual decision (which actually represents the results). The Court pointed out that the headnote is not the work of the Supreme Court and cannot be relied upon to state the Court's decision. Also, for the case cited, the headnote in question had misinterpreted the scope of the decision.

All syllabi issued by the Supreme Court now include a paragraph of boilerplate text to warn readers not to rely on the syllabus for the actual meaning of the decision.

NOTE: Where it is feasible, a syllabus (headnote) will be released, as is being done in connection with this case, at the time the opinion is issued. The syllabus constitutes no part of the opinion of the Court but has been prepared by the Reporter of Decisions for the convenience of the reader. See United States v. Detroit Timber & Lumber Co., 200 U. S. 321, 337.

Because this text appears in the syllabus of every case, United States v. Detroit Timber & Lumber Co. is the Supreme Court case that the Supreme Court cites most often.
