= National Reporter System =

United States case law reports

West's National Reporter System (NRS) is a set of case law reporters for federal courts and appellate state courts in the United States. It started with the North Western Reporter in 1879 which has its origin in The Syllabi (1876, LCCN 2010-213400).

== Federal reporters ==
Federal reporters include:

Title	Abbreviation	Years	Volumes	LCCN
Supreme Court Reporter	S. Ct.	1882–	1–	LCCN 99-537
Federal Cases	F. Cas.	1789–1880	1–30	LCCN 99-32
Federal Reporter	F.	1880–1924	1–300	LCCN 99-4395
Federal Reporter, second series	F.2d	1924–1993	1–999	LCCN 79-641716
Federal Reporter, third series	F.3d	1993–2021	1–999	LCCN 90-657017
Federal Reporter, fourth series	F.4th	2021–	1–	
Federal Supplement	F. Supp.	1932–1997	1–999	LCCN 33-14431
Federal Supplement, second series	F. Supp. 2d	1997–2014	1–999	LCCN 89-642487
Federal Supplement, third series	F. Supp. 3d	2014–	1–	
Federal Rules Decisions	F.R.D.	1941–	1–	LCCN 90-657008
Bankruptcy Reporter	B.R.	1980–	1–	LCCN 80-644389
Federal Appendix	F. App'x	2001–2021	1–861	LCCN 2001-208088

== State reporters ==
For the purpose of state court reporting the 50 states and the District of Columbia are divided into seven regions as follows:

Title	Abbreviation	Years	Volumes	LCCN	States covered
Atlantic Reporter	A.	1885–1938	1–200	LCCN 75-641819	CT, DE, DC, ME, MD, NH, NJ, PA, RI, VT
Atlantic Reporter, second series	A.2d	1938–2010	1–999	LCCN 39-6316	CT, DE, DC, ME, MD, NH, NJ, PA, RI, VT
Atlantic Reporter, third series	A.3d	2010–	1–	LCCN 90-655067	CT, DE, DC, ME, MD, NH, NJ, PA, RI, VT
North Eastern Reporter	N.E.	1885–1936	1–200	LCCN 75-641653	IL, IN, MA, NY, OH
North Eastern Reporter, second series	N.E.2d	1936–2012	1–999	LCCN 36-20384	IL, IN, MA, NY, OH
North Eastern Reporter, third series	N.E.3d	2012–	1–		
North Western Reporter	N.W.	1879–1941	1–300	LCCN 99-1342	IA, MI, MN, NE, ND, SD, WI
North Western Reporter, second series	N.W.2d	1941–	1–	LCCN 42-12503	IA, MI, MN, NE, ND, SD, WI
South Eastern Reporter	S.E.	1887–1938	1–200	LCCN 75-641818	GA, NC, SC, VA, WV
South Eastern Reporter, second series	S.E.2d	1938–	1–	LCCN 89-642322	GA, NC, SC, VA, WV
Southern Reporter	So.	1887–1940	1–200	LCCN 75-641740	AL, FL, LA, MS
Southern Reporter, second series	So. 2d	1940–2009	1–999	LCCN 45-30734	AL, FL, LA, MS
Southern Reporter, third series	So. 3d	2009–	1–	LCCN 88-647630	AL, FL, LA, MS
South Western Reporter	S.W.	1886–1928	1–300	LCCN 75-643936	AR, KY, MO, TN, TX
South Western Reporter, second series	S.W.2d	1928–1999	1–999	LCCN 88-647631	AR, KY, MO, TN, TX
South Western Reporter, third series	S.W.3d	1999–	1–	LCCN 88-647631	AR, KY, MO, TN, TX
Pacific Reporter	P.	1883–1931	1–300	LCCN 75-643937	AK, AZ, CA, CO, HI, ID, KS, MT, NV, NM, OK, OR, UT, WA, WY
Pacific Reporter, second series	P.2d	1931–2000	1–999	LCCN 31-34985	AK, AZ, CA, CO, HI, ID, KS, MT, NV, NM, OK, OR, UT, WA, WY
Pacific Reporter, third series	P.3d	2000–	1–	LCCN 89-647235	AK, AZ, CA, CO, HI, ID, KS, MT, NV, NM, OK, OR, UT, WA, WY

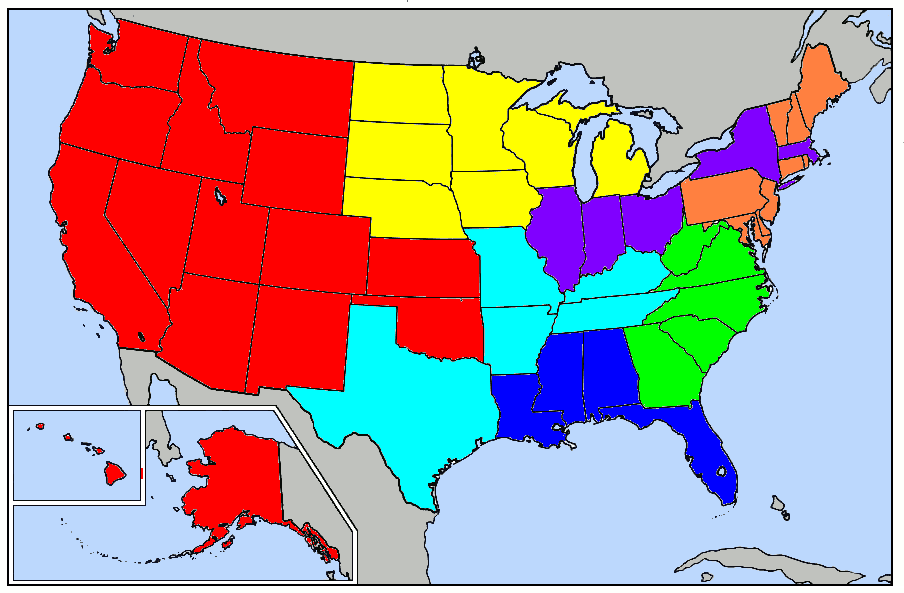
Map of the U.S., showing areas covered by the Thomson West National Reporter System state law reports

These regional reporters are supplemented by reporters for a single state like the New York Supplement (N.Y.S. 1888–1938; 2d 1938–) and the California Reporter (Cal. Rptr. 1959–1991; 2d 1991–2003; 3d 2003–) which include decisions of intermediate state appellate courts. The New York Supplement covers both intermediate appellate courts and state trial courts, since there is also an official reporter for the latter in New York State.

In states without an official reporter, many attorneys and law firms balked in the pre-Internet age at the considerable expense of subscribing to a West regional state law reporter when all they really needed was case law from the appellate courts of their home state. This caused West to produce so-called "offprint" reporters for specific states like Texas and Missouri, of which there are now around 30. With the sole exception of Illinois Decisions (which is consecutively paged), all cases in offprint reporters maintain the volume and page numbers of the regional reporters from which they were taken. In other words, the contents of the offprint reporters look like the relevant regional reporter after all cases from unwanted states have been deleted.

== Additional information ==
Indices of citations are provided by Shepard's Citations while the West American Digest System offers access by hierarchized keywords and headnotes. The NRS reflects the massive volume of reported American case law: over 100,000 court decisions are published by the NRS each year.

Today, the NRS is the primary publication route for opinions from the federal courts of appeals, the federal district courts, and state appellate courts in many states that currently do not have an official reporter (either because they never had one or they are one of the 21 states who abolished their official reporter in favor of the NRS). The NRS is available at law libraries throughout the United States, and is also available through online legal research databases like Westlaw and LexisNexis. Since the NRS now comprises over 10,000 volumes, and many older cases have been overruled or superseded, only the largest law libraries keep a complete hard copy set on site. Most law libraries either do not carry older volumes or retrieve them on request from off-site compact storage.

While enormous in size and vast in scope, the NRS is not entirely comprehensive. In the 1890s, West retroactively brought all pre-1880 published cases of all lower federal courts into the NRS framework by compiling them into the Federal Cases reporter. But West never did the same thing with all U.S. Supreme Court cases which predate the publication of the Supreme Court Reporter, nor with all published state cases that predate the start of the NRS regional or state-level reporters. The NRS does not include opinions from state trial courts, courts administered by territorial governments (as distinguished from federal territorial courts), Indian courts, or administrative agencies at either the federal or state level. Certain opinions from federal courts of appeals, federal district courts, and state appellate courts are not selected or designated for publication. However, all these materials can be found separately on legal research databases.

== See also ==
- United States Reports
