= Anastasoff v. United States =

Constitutional law case decided by the U.S. Eighth Circuit

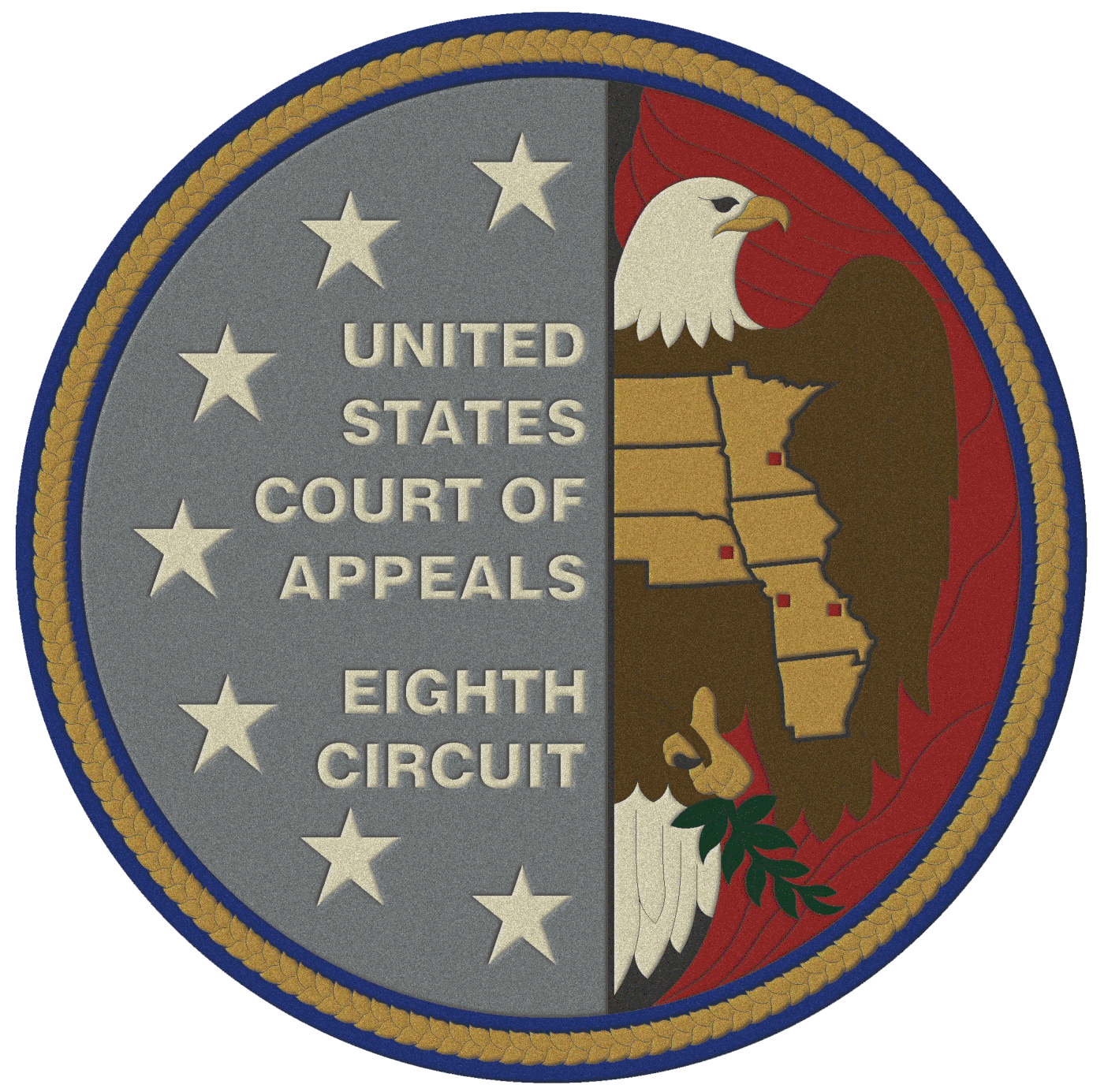
- Court: United States Court of Appeals for the Eighth Circuit
- Full case name: Faye Anastasoff v. United States
- Decided: August 22, 2000
- Citation: 223 F.3d 898 (8th Cir. 2000)

Case history
- Prior history: Judge Catherine D. Perry, E.D. Mo., ruled in favor of the IRS.
- Subsequent history: Vacated as moot on rehearing en banc, 235 F.3d 1054 (8th Cir. 2000)

Court membership
- Judges sitting: Richard S. Arnold, Gerald Heaney, Paul A. Magnuson (D. Minn.)

Laws applied
- Article Three of the United States Constitution

Keywords
- Non-publications

Anastasoff v. United States, 223 F.3d 898 (8th Cir. 2000), was a case decided by the U.S. Eighth Circuit on appeal from the U.S. District Court for the Eastern District of Missouri. It is notable for being the only case to consider the "Anastasoff issue", that is whether Article Three of the United States Constitution requires a federal court to treat unpublished opinions as precedent.

The case was subsequently vacated as moot on rehearing en banc, due to the government's decision to pay the taxpayer's claim in full with interest at the statutory rate. In the final decision, the court opinion stated:

The controversy over the status of unpublished opinions is, to be sure, of great interest and importance, but this sort of factor will not save a case from becoming moot. We sit to decide cases, not issues, and whether unpublished opinions have precedential effect no longer has any relevance for the decision of this tax-refund case.

Before being overturned, the Anastasoff decision was cited by multiple courts that used unpublished opinions in their decisions, such as United States v. Goldman, No. 00-1276 of September 29, 2000, and United States v. Langmade, No. 00-2019 of December 29, 2000.

== See also ==
- Non-publication of legal opinions in the United States
