= Blackstone Press =

British legal publisher

Blackstone Press Limited is a legal publisher that is a subsidiary of Oxford University Press. It was established in March 1988 by Alistair MacQueen. Its management was formerly that of Financial Training Publications, whose law list it purchased. The list included "everyday" reference works, and works that were "essential reading" for examinations of the Law Society and Bar and which had been used for that purpose for seven years. The books published by Blackstone Press were updated and revised frequently. In 2000, Blackstone Press had a revenue of £5 million and a net income of £758k.

Its backlist contained over four hundred books at the time Oxford University Press purchased it from BPP, PLC, in 2001.

Publications

Blackstone Press published, amongst other things, Blackstone's Criminal Practice.
