= North Western Reporter =

United States regional case law reporters

The North Western Reporter and North Western Reporter, Second Series are United States regional case law reporters. It is part of the National Reporter System created by John B. West for West Publishing Company, which is now part of Thomson West.

National Reporter System regions

The North Western Reporter contains published appellate court case decisions for:

- Iowa
- Michigan
- Minnesota
- Nebraska
- North Dakota
- South Dakota
- Wisconsin

When cited, North Western Reporter and North Western Reporter, Second Series are abbreviated "N.W." and "N.W.2d", respectively.
