= List of legal publishers by language area =

The following list provides an overview on major legal publishers by language area.

== English ==
Source: Locating the Law, Chapter 12

1. [Estat Law](India)
2. Executive Press
3. LexisNexis, a division of Reed Elsevier, including
  - LexisNexis Butterworths (UK, Ireland, Canada, Australia, New Zealand, South Africa/Kagiso Media, India/Wadhwa Nagpur)
4. vLex vLexJustis (US, UK, Canada, Caribbean, Australia, New Zealand, Ireland, India, etc.)
5. West Publishing, a subsidiary of Thomson Reuters, including
  - Westlaw
  - FindLaw
6. Law.asia, including
  - Asia Business Law Journal
  - India Business Law Journal
  - China Business Law Journal
7. Wolters Kluwer, including
  - CCH (Commerce Clearing House)
8. James Publishing (United States)
9. Juta (South Africa)
10. Lawyers & Judges Publishing Company, Inc. (United States)
11. vLex (North America & UK)
12. All India Reporter
13. PLD Publishers, kausar law book publishers (Pakistan)
14. Mainstream Law Reports (Bangladesh)
15. LDC Publishers (Uganda)
16. Whitelocke Publications (Oxford, New York, Luxembourg)
17. Edward Elgar Publishing (USA, UK and International)
18. Carolina Academic Press (USA)
19. Bloomsbury Professional (UK and Ireland)
20. Data Trace Publishing Company (United States)
21. LexBooK, Athens (Greece and Cyprus)
22. ΝΟΜΙΚΕΣ ΕΚΔΟΣΕΙΣ LEX BOOK (Greece)
23. Intersentia/Larcier-Intersentia (UK/Belgium/International)

The following are or were legal publishers:

- ARK Group
- Bedford Square Press
- Blackstone Press
- Blackwell Scientific Publications
- Blay's Guides
- Butterworths
- Cameron May
- CCH Editions
- Chancery Law Publishing
- Codify Legal Publishing
- ESC Publishing
- Fourmat Publishing
- Henry Stewart Publications
- Jordans & Sons
- Kluwer Law
- Legal Action Group
- Lloyd's of London Press
- Longmans, (Longman Law Tax & Finance)
- MBC Information Services
- Oxford University Press
- Pitman Publishing
- Shaw & Sons
- Sweet & Maxwell
- Trial Guides
- Tolley Publishing Co Ltd
- Waterlow Directories
- Waterlow Publishers
- William S. Hein
- Whitelocke Publications

== French ==
1. Lefebvre, including
  - Dalloz

== German ==
Source: ARSV

1. Beck, including
  - Nomos
2. Boorberg
3. Deutscher Anwaltverlag
4. de Gruyter
5. Heymanns (Wolters Kluwer)
6. Juris (= Juristisches Informationssystem für die Bundesrepublik Deutschland)
7. ÖGB Verlag, Vienna
8. Manz, Vienna
9. Mohr Siebeck
10. Otto Schmidt
11. Schulthess, Zürich
12. Stämpfli, Bern

== Greece, Cyprus ==
1. Sakkoulas Publications, Athens, Thessaloniki.
2. Nomiki Bibliothiki Publications, Athens.
3. Antonis N. Sakkoulas Publications, Athens.
4. P. N. Sakkoulas Publications, Athens.
5. LexBook, Athens.

== Italian ==
Source: Overview of the Sources of Italian Law

1. Giuffrè
2. Wolters Kluwer Italia, including:
  - UTET Giuridica
  - IPSOA
  - CEDAM
3. Maggioli
4. Giappichelli
5. Il Sole 24 Ore Editore

== Japanese ==
Source: Japanese Law via the Internet

1. Dai-Ichi Hoki
2. Shinnippon-Hoki (Westlaw)
3. Yuhikaku

== Russian ==
Major database providers are:

1. ConsultantPlus
2. Garant
3. Kodeks

== Spanish ==
1. Sepín Editorial Jurídica Sepín
2. vLex vLex (Spain and Latin America)
3. Thomson Reuters-Aranzadi Thomson Reuters-Aranzadi
4. Wolters Kluwer Wolters Kluwer
5. Marcial Pons Marcial Pons
6. Tirant lo Blanch Tirant lo Blanch
7. Reus Reus
8. Dykinson Dykinson
9. Lefebvre Lefebvre
10. Tecnos Tecnos

== Hindi ==
1. Eastern Book Company (India)

== Marathi ==
1. Ajit Prakashan (India)

== Portuguese ==
1. AAFDL - Associação Académica da Faculdade de Direito de Lisboa - Portugal
2. Almedina - Brazil and Portugal
3. Gestlegal - Portugal
4. vLex - Brazil and Portugal
