= Non-publication of legal opinions in the United States =

Non-publication of legal opinions is the practice of a court issuing unpublished opinions. An unpublished opinion is a decision of a court that is not available for citation as precedent because the court deems the case to have insufficient precedential value.

In the system of common law, each judicial decision becomes part of the body of law used in future decisions. However, some courts reserve certain decisions, leaving them "unpublished", and thus not available for citation in future cases. It has been argued that non-publication helps stem the problem of too much written material creating too little new law. Specifically, the number of federal appeals filed annually grew from 23,200 to 33,360 between 1980 and 1985, and 55,000 federal appeals were filed in 2000. Conversely, studies have shown how non-publication can distort the law.

Selective publication is the legal process by which judges or justices of a court decide whether or not a decision is to be published in a reporter. "Unpublished" federal appellate decisions are published in the Federal Appendix. From 2000 to 2008, the U.S. Court of Appeals for the 4th Circuit had the highest rate of non-publication (92%), and more than 85% of the decisions in the 3rd Circuit, 5th Circuit, 9th Circuit, and 11th Circuit went unpublished. Depublication is the power of a court to make a previously published order or opinion unpublished. The California Supreme Court may depublish opinions of the California Courts of Appeal.

== History ==
In 1964, the Judicial Conference of the United States recommended that federal appellate courts publish only those decisions "which are of general precedential value." Since 1976, every federal appellate court has adopted rules limiting the publication of opinions. Most federal appellate courts publish fewer than half of their decisions on the merits. As of the year 2004, some 80% of United States Courts of Appeals decisions are unpublished. In Anastasoff v. United States, the U.S. Court of Appeals for the 8th Circuit struck down non-publication, but the decision was later declared moot. In Hart v. Massanari, the U.S. Court of Appeals for the 9th Circuit upheld non-publication as constitutional.

On September 20, 2005 the Judicial Conference of the United States voted to approve rule 32.1 of the Federal Rules of Appellate Procedure, allowing citation of unpublished decisions issued after January 1, 2007. Judge Samuel Anthony Alito, Jr. (since appointed to the Supreme Court of the United States) was then the chair of this committee. More than 500 public comments were received from supporters and opponents of the new rule.

== Controversy ==
The issue of unpublished decisions has been described as the most controversial to be faced by the Advisory Committee on the Federal Rules of Appellate Procedure in the 1990s and 2000s.

There is active debate on the fairness issues raised by non-publication, and the utility of non-publication in the light of computerization of court records. It has been argued that the behavior of judges and litigants indicates that "unpublished" does not mean "unimportant" and that technology has affected the storage costs, research costs and intellectual costs associated with publication of opinions. A "shadow body of law" has developed, leading to concerns about unfair use and access. It has been argued that the "hidden" conflict between published and unpublished decisions is hard to square with fundamental principles of equal justice. Unpublished decisions have also been criticized as an abdication of responsibility, in that it frees judges from the responsibility of preparing publication-worthy opinions in every case.

Critics also have shown that courts often do not adhere to the announced criteria for designating an opinion as unpublished. Thus, Donald Songer showed that many unpublished opinions reverse the decision of the lower, district court. He reasons that such a decision cannot be considered a matter of long-settled law, given the lower court's error. And Michael Hannon noted the frequency in which unpublished opinions include a dissent or concurrence, another sign that the case did not involve settled law.

The idea that unpublished opinions would be treated by courts as if they did not exist because they were relatively inaccessible to many lawyers, were thought to involve only well-established legal principles, and were otherwise unsuitable for the precedential status usually accorded to decisions of the federal appellate courts has been described as a legal fiction.
