= Federal Cases =

Case law reporter in United States (1789–1880)

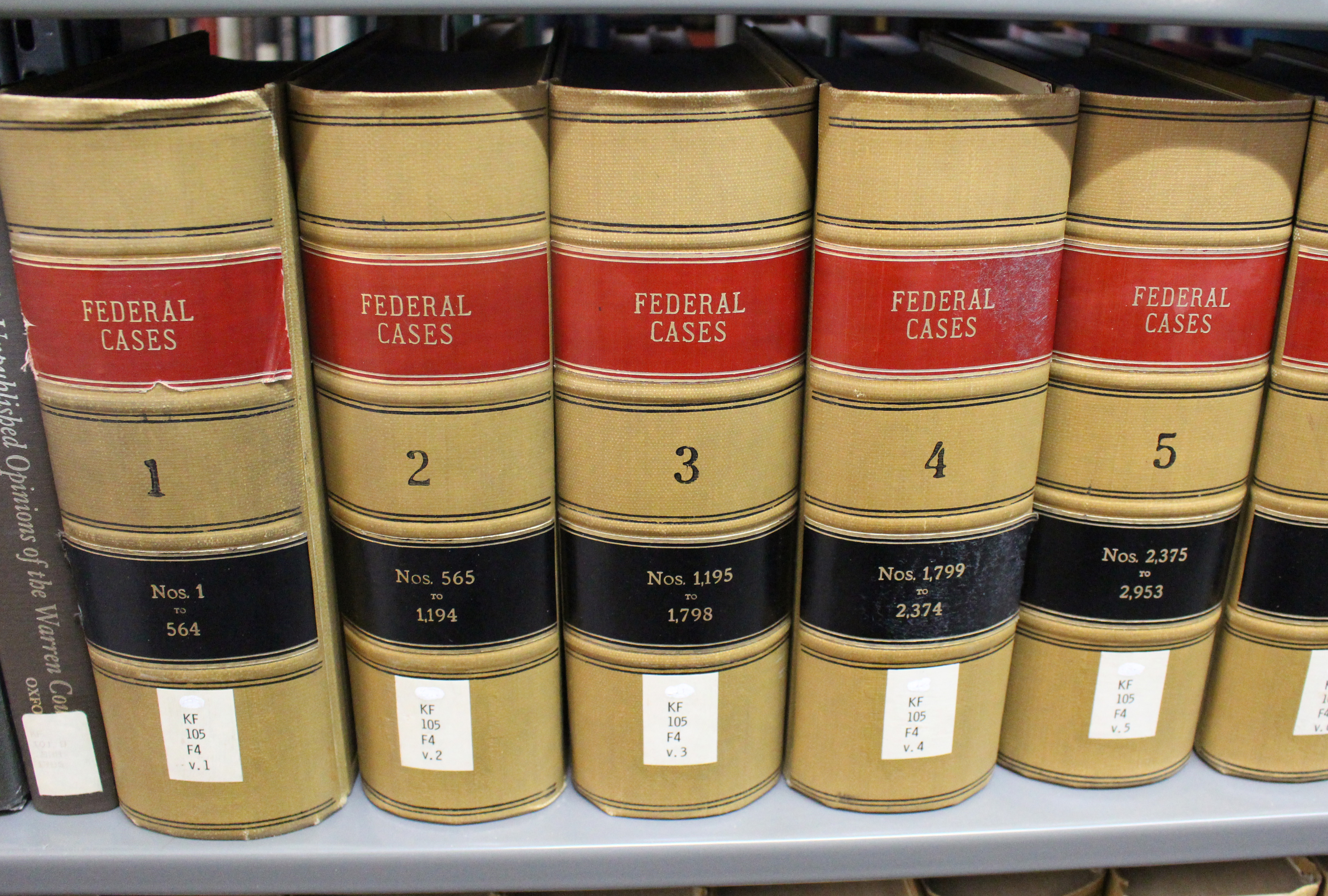
Federal Cases

Federal Cases, circuit and district courts, 1789–1880 (in case citations, abbreviated F. Cas.) was a reporter of cases decided by the United States district and circuit courts between 1789 and 1880. It is part of the National Reporter System.

In 1880, West Publishing Company began reporting decisions from all federal courts in the Federal Reporter, and the Federal Reporter soon became established as the leading unofficial reporter for the federal circuit and district courts. But opinions of those courts issued prior to 1880 had been previously published in a variety of separate reporters from dozens of private entrepreneurs. Before the start of the Federal Reporter, approximately 327 reporter volumes had been published under the supervision of 87 different editors.

Federal Cases, then, was West Publishing's attempt to collect and republish all federal opinions from 1789 to 1880 in a single reporter which would be part of its National Reporter System, just like the Federal Reporter. That is, as with other NRS reporters, the cases included were annotated by West attorney-editors with "headnotes" summarizing their holdings, and the headnotes were then indexed for easy cross-referencing to similar cases through the West American Digest System. Republishing all those old cases within the NRS framework meant that subsequent generations of lawyers and judges would be able to resort solely to West reporters to access the entire extant universe of post-1789 case law from all federal courts inferior to the U.S. Supreme Court.

Federal Cases was published in 30 numbered volumes from 1894 to 1897. Unlike the vast majority of reporters which publish cases in chronological order, the contents of Federal Cases were arranged in alphabetical order based on the first letter of each case title. Each of the cases was assigned a sequential number by West, for a total of 18,313 opinions. The advantage of publishing in alphabetical order was that the cases published in Federal Cases would not have cited to each other based on their volume and page in a future reporter that did not yet exist; but case citations normally began (and still begin) with the case title, which would usually remain the same. The disadvantage of alphabetical order is that it makes sense only if all the cases to be included were gathered at the beginning. In an era before modern computerized databases, errors were inevitable, with the result that volume 30 ran through Z, then started over again at A to include a few more cases (and other miscellaneous materials) omitted the first time around.

Of course, many of the cases published in Federal Cases cited other cases published in Federal Cases, but the original text of each opinion would have cited to the volumes and pages of the various reporters in which those cases had originally been published. Since the entire point of the project was to supersede those old reporters, all cases published in Federal Cases were edited so that all such citations were replaced with citations to the appropriate Federal Cases case numbers.

At the end of the project, a 31st volume was subsequently published which contained only a digest and various tables (that is, a navigation guide to the content already published); thus, some law library catalogs show Federal Cases as consisting of 31 volumes.

Because the cases published in Federal Cases are so old, it is rarely consulted and is found only at large law libraries.
