= Dominion Law Reports =

Canadian law report

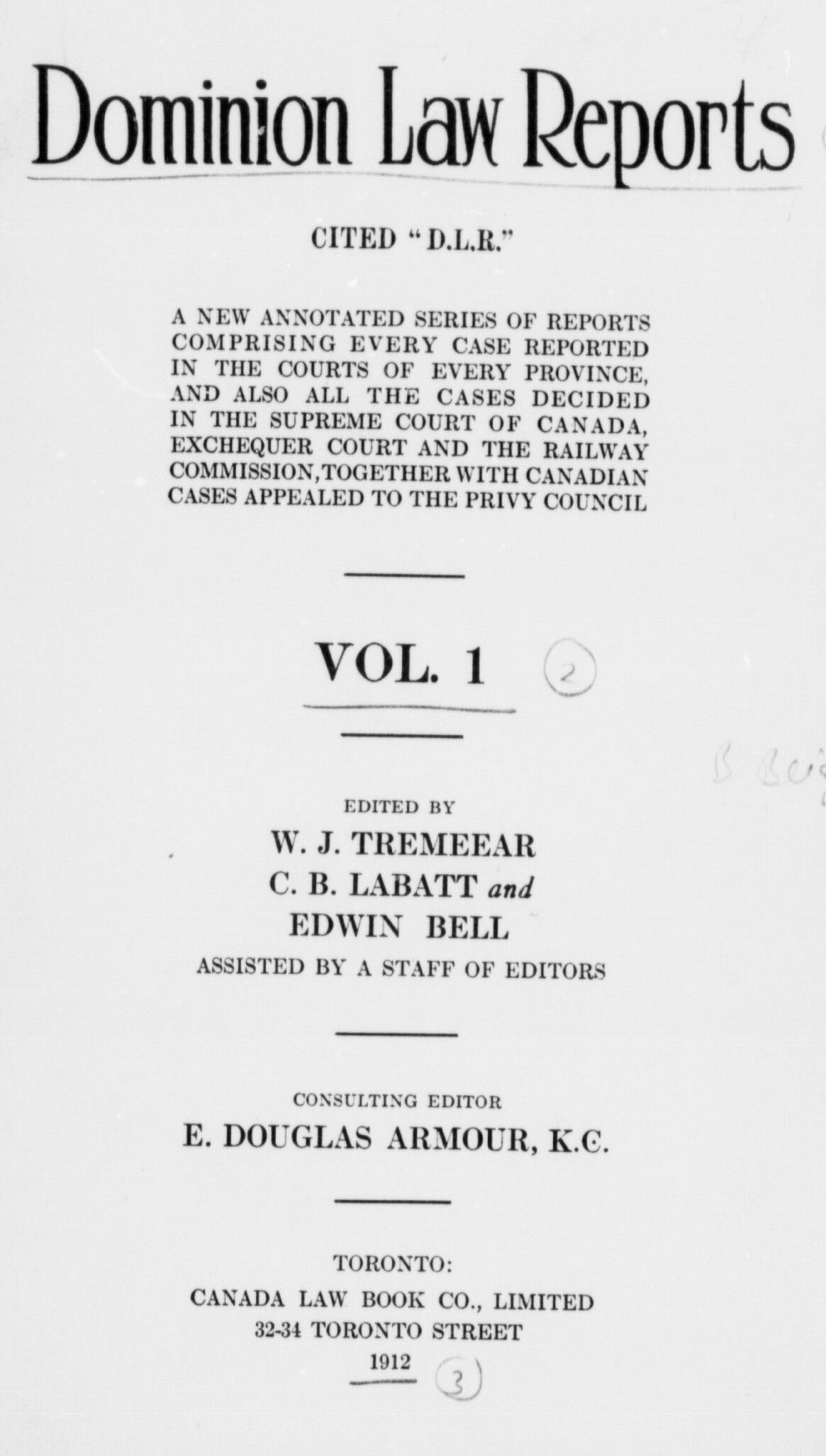
Cover page of the first volume of the Dominion Law Reports, 1912.

The Dominion Law Reports (DLR) is a Canadian law report, first published in 1912. The report is published by Canada Law Book Ltd. It contains select reports of cases from both federal and provincial courts in all areas of law. Its early editors included W. J. Tremeaar and Robert Willes Chitty, the son of British jurist Thomas Willes Chitty, editor of Halsbury's.

== Sources ==
- Banks, Margaret A. (1985). Using a Law Library: A Guide for Students and Lawyers in the Common Law Provinces of Canada. Toronto: Carswell. ISBN 9780459376109. OCLC 1151678167.
- Yogis, John A.; Christie, I. M.; Iosipescu, Michael (1988). Legal Writing and Research Manual. Butterworths. ISBN 9780409811544. OCLC 744512664.
- Foote, Martha L., ed. (1997). Law Reporting and Legal Publishing in Canada: A History. Canadian Association of Law Libraries. ISBN 9780969676317. OCLC 1035923392.
