= Syllabus (legal) =

Syllabus in a legal context refers to a summary or an outline of the key points of a court's decision or opinion. It is often written by the court as an official part of the decision, but it is usually not considered a binding part of the legal ruling. The syllabus serves to provide a quick reference or overview of the court's reasoning and conclusions in the case.

== Overview ==
The syllabus is typically found at the beginning of a judicial opinion and is used to summarize the court's decision, the facts of the case, the legal issues involved, and the reasoning behind the court's conclusions. The Supreme Court generally includes a syllabus in all their opinions, written by the reporter, though the Justices occasionally edit them. The Supreme Court is explicit that the syllabus is not part of the official opinion and therefore does not carry legal weight. For instance, in United States v. Detroit Timber & Lumber Co. the Supreme Court criticized a side for relying upon a statement of law in a case's syllabus that was not present in the opinion itself.

However, in some systems the Syllabus takes on a much higher role. The Ohio Supreme Court stated that

The law in Ohio since 1858 has been that it is the syllabus of the [state] Supreme Court decisions which states the law, i.e., the points of law decided in a case are to be found in the syllabus. Therefore, where the justice assigned to write the opinion discusses matters or expresses his opinion on questions not in the syllabus, the language is merely the personal opinion of the writer.

— State v. Wilson, 58 Ohio St. 2d 52, 60 (1979)

Some legal scholars and practitioners have criticized the use of syllabi, arguing that they may oversimplify complex legal arguments or misrepresent the nuances of a court's reasoning. Others have argued that syllabi should be relied upon more as the actual, core holding of a case, and that models like Ohio are superior.

== See also ==
- United States v. Detroit Timber & Lumber Co.
- Hawley v. Diller
- Headnote – Summary of the key aspects of a legal case
