= Session Cases =

Session Cases are the authoritative law reports of cases heard in the Scottish courts. They are now published by the Scottish Council of Law Reporting (SCLR), a charity established by the legal profession, with the prime purpose of publishing what are the nearest thing to 'official' law reports that exist in Scotland, as evidenced by Practice Notes from both the Court of Session and the High Court of Justiciary directing that Session Cases law reports must be cited in preference to any other source if the case being cited is reported in Session Cases.

The series commenced in 1821. Initially the law reports were of cases heard in the Court of Session only and were named for the editors who managed the collection of law reports thus Shaw (1821–37), Dunlop (1838–61), Macpherson (1862–72), Rettie (1873–97) and Fraser (1898–1905). There is no Session Cases volume numbered for 1906 and the series recommenced, as Session Cases, with different annual coverage with the 1907 volume. The series has covered cases heard in the High Court of Justiciary, Scotland's supreme criminal court since the beginning of the Rettie series in 1873.

The series now reports cases heard in all the superior courts hearing Scottish cases: The United Kingdom Supreme Court (formerly the Appellate Committee of the House of Lords); the Privy Council; the High Court of Justiciary; the Court of Session (both Inner and Outer Houses); and, since 2016, the Sheriff Appeal Court (both criminal and civil appeals).

The SCLR has digitised all the cases reported in Session Cases from 1821 and the digital form of these reports is available from the commercial law reporting services offered by vLex (Justis), Lexis and Westlaw. Current law reports published in Session Cases are available in hard copy from the SCLR itself and in digital form on these three commercial services.

Uniquely, in Scotland, all the law reports published in Session Cases are prepared by practising advocates or solicitor advocates who have rights of audience in the Scottish courts whose cases they report.
