= Casemaker =

Web-based legal research system

Casemaker is a Web-based legal research system that is part of Fastcase following a 2021 merger. State bar associations join the Casemaker system to provide online legal research services for dues-paying attorney members. The Casemaker system allows users to search and browse a variety of legal information such as statutes, regulations, and case law on the Web. Casemaker is designed to be navigable and provide its users with current and accurate legal materials.

== See also ==
- LexisNexis
- Westlaw
- vLex
