= Headnote =

Summary of the key aspects of a legal case

A headnote is a summary of the key aspects of a legal case, that is added to the text of a court decision to aid readers in locating discussion of a legal issue in an opinion. Headnotes appear at the beginning of a published opinion and are generally written by independent legal publishers.

In 1906, the Supreme Court of the United States ruled in United States v. Detroit Timber & Lumber Co. that headnotes have no legal standing and therefore do not set precedent.

== See also ==
- Case law
- Syllabus (legal)
