= West American Digest System =

Legal system

The West American Digest System is a system of identifying points of law from reported cases and organizing them by topic and key number. The system was developed by West Publishing to organize the entire body of American law. This extensive taxonomy makes the process of doing case law legal research less time consuming as it directs the researcher to cases that are similar to the legal issue under consideration.

== History ==
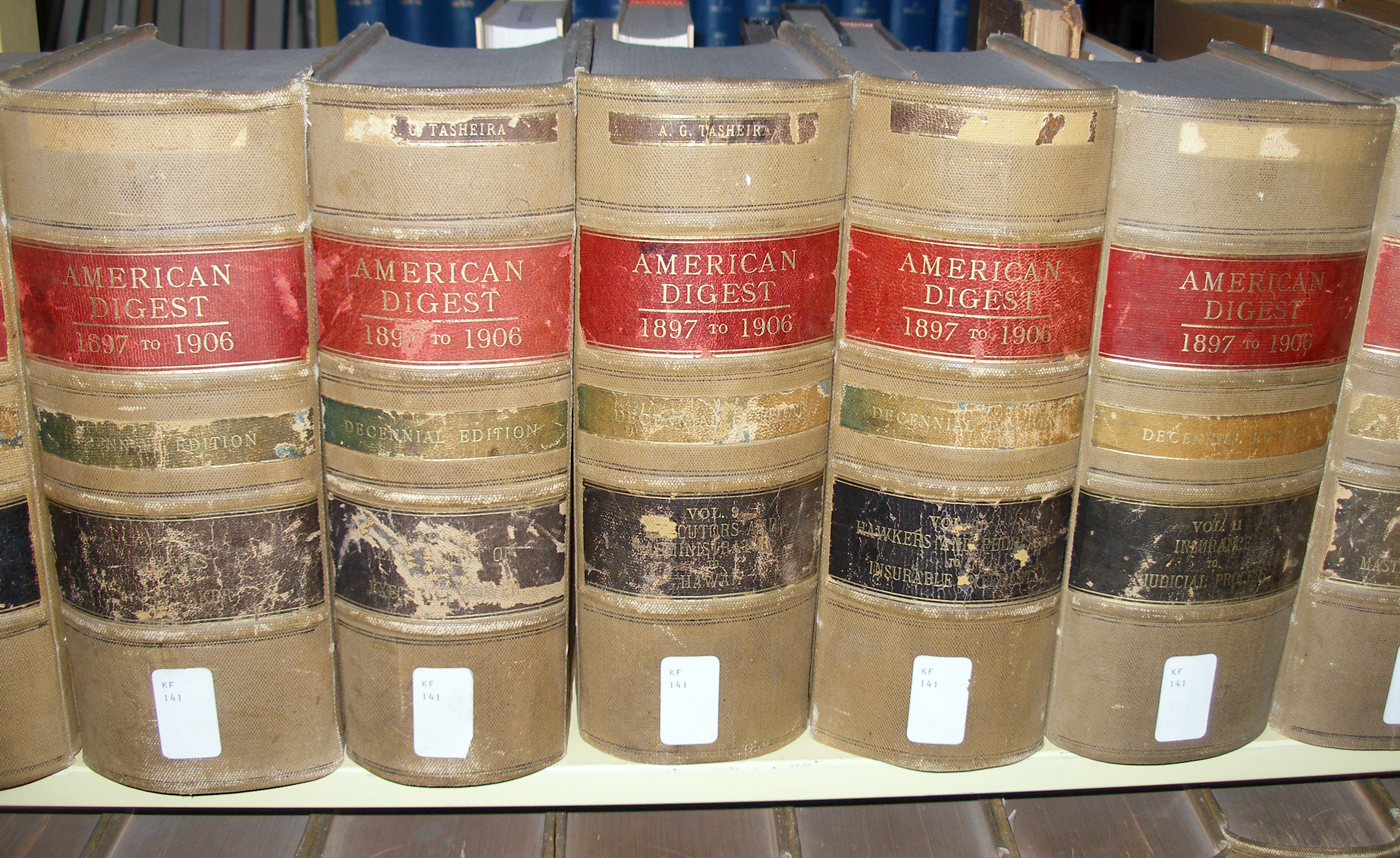
Early volumes of the American Digest

The problem of finding cases on a particular topic was a large problem for the rapidly growing American legal system of the 19th century. John B. West, the founder of West Publishing, described this problem in his article A multiplicity of reports. To solve the problem, he developed a system with two major parts. First, his company began to regularly publish cases from many American jurisdictions in bound volumes called reporters (the West National Reporter System now covers all state and federal appellate courts, as well as certain trial courts). Second, he put together a classification system in which he divided the law into major categories which he called topics (such as "Contracts"). He then created hundreds of subcategories. To save space in printing, these were given a number called a key number. He then applied this "topic and key number" system to the cases he published. The key number is identified in the books with a key number and a key symbol graphic.

John West was not the original creator of the digest system which now bears his name; it predates the creation of the National Reporter System. In 1847, Little, Brown and Company started to publish the United States Digest, a digest of all state and federal case law since 1790. In 1870, Little, Brown hired brothers Benjamin and Austin Abbott to start over and prepare a new series of the United States Digest from scratch. Then in 1889, West Publishing Company acquired Abbott's United States Digest from Little, Brown, renamed it the American Digest in 1890, and hired John A. Mallory to "build upon Abbott's improvements in law digesting". In 1909, West Publishing began to aggressively market its system of topic and key numbering as the West Key Number System.

Since then, to reinforce how West digests and reporters are intended to be used together for legal research, the printed volumes of reporters in the National Reporter System are traditionally marked by a "West Key Number System" logo on their spines.

At the encouragement of the American Bar Association, West also licensed the West Key Number System "to nearly every independently published state digest", and invited writers of treatises and textbooks to include West key numbers in their publications.

== How it works ==
Each case published in a West reporter is evaluated by a West "attorney-editor" who identifies and summarizes the points of law cited or explained in the case. The attorney-editor places the summaries of the points of law covered in the case at the beginning of the case. These summaries are usually a paragraph long, and are called headnotes. Each headnote is then assigned a topic and key number. The headnotes are arranged according to their topic and key number in multi-volume sets of books called Digests. A digest serves as a subject index to the case law published in West reporters. Headnotes are merely editorial guides to the points of law discussed or used in the cases, and the headnotes themselves are not legal authority.

West publishes West's Analysis of American Law, which is a complete guide to the topic and key number system, and it is revised periodically.

== Print digest ==
In print, a digest works like an encyclopedia, in that the topics are listed in alphabetical order and printed on the spines. The "Descriptive Word Index" provides guidance as to the proper topics and key numbers.

The digest system includes digests for the individual states (except for Delaware, Nevada and Utah). The U.S. Supreme Court, the Court of Federal Claims, bankruptcy courts, and military courts each have an individual digest, and all their decisions are also included in the Federal Practice Digest together with the notes of decisions from the federal District Courts and Courts of Appeals. Digests are also published for West's National Reporter System. Specialty subject digests exist, such as the Education Law Digest, and the Social Security Digest.

For nationwide research, about once a month, West publishes a General Digest volume, which incorporates classified digest notes from all reporters of the West National Reporter System. These are then cumulated into a Decennial Digest. Decennial implies that this occurs every ten years, but in the past several decades, there have been Decennial Digest Parts I and II (the 11th Series now has Part III, so the cumulation is now more frequent. However, the various Decennial Digests are not cumulated. Thus, completing such a search over several decades requires consulting the Decennial Digests, and then updating that work with the most recent series of the General Digest.

Some of the state and topical digests are revised to include the first cases in the jurisdiction, while the spines of the books of some of the other digests indicate that they are from "1933 to date," for instance, indicating that one must consult a prior series for references to earlier cases. The state, federal, regional, and topical digests are updated by interim pamphlets, pocket parts, replacement volumes, or a new series.

== The Digest on Westlaw ==
Researchers can also search the digest electronically using Westlaw:

- with the "Key Number Search Tool", which uses a word search to identify up to five key numbers,
- with the "Key Numbers and Digest" feature (browse by subject using an expandable tree – no search terms required),
- by a key number search using the "Terms and Connectors" method (with a known topic and key number – in the form of 134k261; topic 134 is Divorce and the key number is 261 for "Enforcement, In general"),
- by using the KeySearch feature (a menu of hierarchical links that automatically generates a search without the need to see the key numbers or the terms and connectors query), or
- by finding a relevant case using keyword searching and then using the key number hyperlinks in the document to find related cases.

Most secondary sources published by Thomson West, such as Corpus Juris Secundum and American Jurisprudence, also have key number hyperlinks in their online Westlaw versions.

The "Key Numbers and Digest" feature and the hyperlinks create a "Custom Digest".

The Custom Digest allows:

- selection of the jurisdiction of interest (so that headnotes from cases in that jurisdiction will appear in the results);
- limiting the time frame of the search; and
- adding additional search terms.

Selecting key numbers and jurisdictions in the "Key Number Search Tool" results in a similar display of digest headnotes.

Since all West headnote annotations are merged on Westlaw into a single database from which each Custom Digest is generated, there is no need to consult each separate series of the hard copy Decennial Digest. Full text of the cases may be accessed from the Custom Digest by clicking or activating the hyperlinks on the case citations. This will cause Westlaw to retrieve selected cases from a case law database, as long as the database is part of the user's regular subscription plan.

== Other digest systems ==
Other digest systems exist, including Butterworth's Digest for the United Kingdom (also containing references to cases decided in other Commonwealth countries), the Canadian Abridgment, digests associated with official state reports, such as in California and Wisconsin, and digests associated with topical reporters, such as the Uniform Commercial Code Case Digest. Most of these use a topic and section format, while some, like the U.C.C. Case Digest, use a section format based on the statute or rules being annotated. The A.L.R. Digest, accompanying the American Law Reports, formerly had its own classification system, but was replaced in 2004 by West's American Law Reports Digest, which follows West's topic and key number system.

== See also ==
- Citator
- Legal research

== External references ==
- West Topic & Key Number System - Westlaw Quick Reference Guide(.pdf)
- West product search for Key Number Digest
- West's Analysis of American Law product description
- West's A.L.R. Digest product description
