= West (publisher) =

American publisher of legal materials

- Logo used from 1999 to 2008
- Parent company: Thomson Reuters
- Founded: 1873
- Founder: John Briggs West
- Country of origin: United States
- Headquarters location: Eagan, Minnesota
- Publication types: Books, databases
- Nonfiction topics: Law
- Official website: legal.thomsonreuters.com

West (also known by its original name, West Publishing) is a business owned by Thomson Reuters that publishes legal, business, and regulatory information in print, and on electronic services such as Westlaw. Since the late 19th century, West has been one of the most prominent publishers of legal materials in the United States. Its headquarters is in Eagan, Minnesota; it also had an office in Rochester, New York, until it closed in 2019, and in Cleveland, Ohio, until it closed in 2010. Organizationally, West is part of the global legal division of Thomson Reuters.

== History ==
West Publishing was founded by John Briggs West. In 1872, he went into business for himself as "John B. West, Publisher and Book Seller", reprinting legal treatises, publishing legal forms, and producing an index to the Minnesota statutes. He arranged for a Swedish-language version of the state's rules of practice, for the state's many Scandinavian-born lawyers and judges.

In 1876, his business had expanded to the point that he took on his older brother, Horatio (1848–1936) as a partner, and in 1882, with a couple of outside investors, the enterprise was incorporated as "West Publishing Company". Their first continuing publication was The Syllabi, a collection of the summaries of all, and the full texts of some, of the decisions of the State and federal courts of Minnesota; this proved so popular that in 1877 it was expanded to include the courts of Wisconsin and renamed The North Western Reporter and within a couple of years added coverage of several more states and became the cornerstone of what was to become West's National Reporter System (NRS), a system of regional reporters, each of which became known for reporting state court appellate decisions within its region.

The West brothers also introduced the American Digest System, prefacing the court decisions with "headnotes" quoting (as nearly verbatim as possible) the holdings of the decision and categorized with key numbers so that analogous holdings from different decisions and even from different states could be grouped together.

The West company was embroiled in at least three crucial lawsuits early in its history, which established that state court decisions were in the public domain and not copyrighted (although West's headnotes and key number system could be copyrighted). By 1902, the West Publishing Company could boast of publishing law books "by the millions".

West also publishes decisions of the federal Courts of Appeals in the Federal Reporter and of the federal district courts in the Federal Supplement, and retroactively republished the decisions of all lower federal courts predating the NRS in Federal Cases. All these reporters are also part of the NRS, meaning that all cases published therein are annotated with headnotes by West attorney-editors, and all those headnotes are then indexed in the West American Digest System (and its electronic version, KeyCite) for easy cross-referencing.

Technically, all of West's reporters were originally unofficial reporters published without the express authorization or endorsement of the courts. West reporters have become the nationwide de facto standard used by all federal courts and most state courts, despite their technically unofficial nature. Indeed, over 20 states have discontinued publication of their own official reporters, and a few states with West's cooperation began inserting certificates in the volumes of the relevant West regional reporter to certify it as their official reporter.

Both brothers retired to southern California.

In 1995, West retained the services of A.G. Edwards and Goldman Sachs in a search for potential purchasers. Thomson purchased West in 1996. Thomson also consolidated into West a number of other law book companies purchased by either Thomson or West, including Bancroft-Whitney, Banks-Baldwin, Barclay, Callaghan & Company, Clark Boardman, Foundation Press, Gilbert's, Harrison, Lawyers Cooperative Publishing, and Warren, Gorham & Lamont. As a condition of the purchase, Thomson sold 52 titles (including the Supreme Court Reports, Lawyers' Edition) to LexisNexis. Today, West also publishes some treatise titles purchased from Shepard's (but not Shepard's Citations). Through these acquisitions, Thomson has become one of the "big three" legal publishers, along with LexisNexis and Wolters Kluwer. Following the acquisition by Thomson, West was known as WIPG, West Information Publishing Group. From 1997 to 2004, West was known as "West Group".

In 2009–10, West began offering buyouts to its U.S. editorial staff as it began to move editorial production overseas. In 2013, West sold its academic publishing, including Foundation Press, to Eureka Growth Capital.

== West products and services ==
- AAJ Press
- American Casebook series
- American Jurisprudence
- American Law Reports
- Aspatore Books
- Bankruptcy Reporter (B.R.)
- Black Letter series
- Black's Law Dictionary
- Calendars
- Case law
- CLE programs
- Concepts and Insights series
- Contact networks
- Corpus Juris Secundum
- Court rules
- Dictionaries/desk references
- Digests
- Document retrieval services
- Exam Pro series
- Federal Reporter
- Federal Supplement
- Findlaw
- Forms
- Handbooks
- Hornbook series
- Jury instructions
- Keycite and Citators
- Law firm marketing services
- Law reviews and journals
- Law school casebooks
- Law school publications
- Lawyering skills
- Legal assistant/paralegal
- Legal encyclopedias
- LiveNote
- Nutshell series
- Practical Law
- Practitioner treatises
- Public records
- Reporters
- Restatements of the Law
- Rutter Group
- Statutes
- Supreme Court Reporter
- Turning Point series
- Uniform Laws Annotated
- United States Code Congressional and Administrative News
- University Casebook series
- University Textbook series
- USCA (United States Code Annotated)
- West American Digest System
- Westlaw
- WestlawNext
- West Court Reporting Services
- West LegalEdcenter
- Words And Phrases
