= Lists of legal terms =

The following pages contain lists of legal terms:

- Glossary of law
- List of Latin legal terms
- List of legal abbreviations
- List of legal abbreviations (canon law)
- on Wiktionary:
  - Appendix: English legal terms
  - Appendix: Glossary of legal terms

== See also ==
- Category:Law-related lists
- Outline of law: Lists
- Legal terminology textbook
- List of Latin phrases
