= List of legal abbreviations =

List of abbreviations used in law and legal documents

This is a list of abbreviations used in law and legal documents. It is common practice in legal documents to cite other publications by using standard abbreviations for the title of each source. Abbreviations may also be found for common words or legal phrases. Such citations and abbreviations are found in court decisions, statutes, regulations, journal articles, books, and other documents. Publishers adopt different practices regarding how abbreviations are printed, and abbreviations may be with or without periods for each letter. For example, the Code of Federal Regulations may appear abbreviated as "C.F.R." or just as "CFR".

== Legal citations ==
=== Canon law ===
- CCEO — Codex Canonum Ecclesiarum Orientalium, the Code of Canons of the Eastern Churches
- CIC — Codex Iuris Canonici, the Code of Canon Law (further specified as 1983 CIC or 1917 CIC)
- CJS — Corpus Juris Secundum
- S.R.R. — Sacræ Rotæ Romanæ, the Tribunal of the Roman Rota
- SRRDec — Sacræ Rotæ Romanæ Decisiones

=== Common law ===
- AD - South African Law Reports, Appellate Division
- All SA — All South African Law Reports
- BAILII - British and Irish Legal Information Institute
- B.A.P. — Bankruptcy Appellate Panel
- BCLR – Butterworths Constitutional Law Reports (South Africa)
- BLLR – Butterworths Labour Law Reports (South Africa)
- CJEU – Court of Justice of the European Union
- CBJ — California Bar journal
- CCH — Commerce Clearing House, a publisher of case law reporters owned by Wolters Kluwer
- CCR — California Code of Regulations (official text?) (source: Thomson/West)
- DLR — Dominion Law Reports (Canadian law report)
- I.L.M. — International Legal Materials
- ILJ – Industrial Law Journal
- ILJ – Industrial Law Journal (South Africa)
- IRB — Internal Revenue Bulletin (from July 2003 to date)
- ILRM — Irish Law Reports Monthly
- IR — Irish Law Reports
- IRC — Internal Revenue Code
- R.I.A.A. — Reports of International Arbitral Awards
- SA – South African Law Reports
- S.A. - Société Anonyme
- SACR – South African Criminal Law Reports
- SALLR – South African Labour Law Reports
- SC – Senior Counsel
- S.C.R. (or SCR) — Supreme Court Reports (Supreme Court of Canada)
- S. Ct. — Supreme Court Reporter (Supreme Court of the United States)
- S.E. — South Eastern Reporter
- So. — Southern Reporter
- S.R. & O. — Statutory Rules and Orders (Ireland)

==== United Kingdom ====
- AC — Appeal Cases (United Kingdom law report)
- All ER — All England Law Reports
- Bla.Com. or Bl. Com. — Blackstone's Commentaries on the Laws of England
- EWCA — England and Wales Court of Appeal
- EWCA Crim — England and Wales Court of Appeal Criminal Division
- MLR – Modern Law Review
- WLR — Weekly Law Reports

==== United States ====
- A. — Atlantic Reporter
- A.L.R. — American Law Reports
- Am. Jur. — American Jurisprudence
- BR or B/R — Bankruptcy (also the abbreviation for the United States bankruptcy courts reporter, West's Bankruptcy Reporter)
- C.F.R. — Code of Federal Regulations
- Ct. Cl. — the United States Court of Federal Claims Reporter
- F. — Federal Reporter
- F.App'x — Federal Appendix
- F.Cas. — Federal Cases 1789–1880
- Fed. Reg. (sometimes FR) — Federal Register (see Federal Register for full text from 1994 to date)
- Fed. R. Bankr. P. — Federal Rules of Bankruptcy Procedure
- Fed. R. Civ. P. (sometimes FRCP) — Federal Rules of Civil Procedure
- Fed. R. Crim. P. — Federal Rules of Criminal Procedure
- Fed. R. Evid. (sometimes FRE) — Federal Rules of Evidence
- F. Supp. — Federal Supplement
- GATT — General Agreement on Tariffs and Trade
- KRS - Kentucky Revised Statutes
- L.Ed — Lawyers' Edition
- L.Ed.2d — Lawyers 2nd Edition
- MPC — Model Penal Code
- N.E. — North Eastern Reporter
- N.W. — North Western Reporter
- O.R.C. — Ohio Revised Code
- P. — Pacific Reporter
- RCW — Revised Code of Washington
- Rev. Commrs. — Revenue Commissioners
- Rev. Proc. — Revenue Procedure (published in IRB)
- Rev. Rul. — Revenue Ruling (published in IRB)
- Stat. — United States Statutes at Large (See United States Code)
- S.W. — South Western Reporter
- T.C. — Reported decisions of the United States Tax Court
- T.D. — Treasury Decision
- UCC — Uniform Commercial Code
- UCMJ — Uniform Code of Military Justice (Laws of the U.S. military)
- UPC — Uniform Probate Code
- U.S. — United States Reports (beginning with v. 502 (1991))
- USC — United States Code (A free website for the full text is at U.S. Code. This text is maintained by the U.S. Gov't Printing Office, but must be checked for revisions or amendments after its effective date.)
- USCA — United States Code Annotated
- USCCAN — United States Code Congressional and Administrative News
- USCS — United States Code Service
- UST — United States Treaties and Other International Agreements (See Treaty series.)
- WAC — Washington Administrative Code
- W. Va. Code — West Virginia Code (unofficial text)

=== International law ===
- ECHR – European Convention on Human Rights
- ECtHR – European Court of Human Rights
- EComHR – European Commission of Human Rights
- ECJ – European Court of Justice
- ECLI – European Case Law Identifier
- ECR – European Court Reports
- EGC – European General Court
- ELR – European Law Reporter

== Symbol ==
- © or [Copr.] or C — Copyright (meaning someone claims ownership of the text, book, music, software, etc.)
- ® — Registered Trademark (typically a word or phrase identifying a company or product, e.g. Coca-Cola)
- ™ — Trademark (interim symbol used after an application for Trademark protection has been filed with the appropriate trademark office (in U.S. - USPTO), but before it has been approved)
- ¶ (Pilcrow) — Paragraph
- ¶¶ — Multiple Paragraphs
- § — section
- §§ — Multiple Sections
- Π (Greek letter Pi) or P — Plaintiff
- Δ (Greek letter Delta) or D — Defendant

== Acronyms ==
- ABA — American Bar Association
- ATS — At the suit of
- CA — Court of Appeal
- CFR — Call for Response (At the US Supreme Court, if the other side has stated it will not respond to a petition for cert., any Justice may direct the Clerk to call for a response.)
- CRS — Congressional Research Service
- DJ — District judge (United Kingdom)
- DWOP — dismissal for want of prosecution
- GAL — Guardian ad litem
- GC — General Counsel
- GmbH - Gesellschaft mit beschränkter Haftung (limited liability company)
- GVR — Grant, Vacate, and Remand
- HC — High Court
- HDC — Holder in due course
- ICJ – International Court of Justice
- ISLN — International Standard Lawyer Number
- JMOL — Judgment as a matter of law
- JNOV — Judgment notwithstanding verdict
- L/C — Letter of credit
- LP — Limited partnership
- LLP — Limited liability partnership
- LLLP — Limited liability limited partnership
- LOI — Letter of Intent
- MIL — Motion in limine
- MOU — Memorandum of Understanding
- M.P. — motu proprio
- MSJ — Motion for summary judgment
- NDA — Non-Disclosure Agreement
- PA — Professional association
- PC — Professional corporation
- PLLC – Professional limited liability company
- POA — power of attorney
- SCOTUS — Supreme Court of the United States (Supreme Court of the United States)
- SI — Statutory instruments
- S/J — Summary judgment
- SMJ — Subject-matter jurisdiction
- SOL — Statute of Limitations
- UKPC – Privy Council of the United Kingdom
- UKSC – Supreme Court of the United Kingdom

=== Titles ===
- AG or A-G – Advocate general (European Union), Attorney general
- B. — baron (a judge of various Courts of Exchequer)
- BFP — Bona fide purchaser
- CJ – Chief justice
- LJ – Postnominals of a Lord or Lady Justice of Appeal (United Kingdom)
- LJJ – Postnominals of Lords or Ladies Justice of Appeal, plural (United Kingdom)
- LL.B. – Legum Baccalaureus — Bachelor of Laws
- LLC — Limited liability company
- LL.D. – Legum Doctor — Doctor of Law
- LL.M. – Legum Magister — Master of Laws
- MR — Postnominals of the Master of the Rolls
- J — Judge or Justice or Journal, according to jurisdiction
- JA – Appellate judge
- JD — Juris Doctor
- JCD — Juris Canonici Doctor, Doctor of Canon Law
- JCL — Juris Canonici Licentiatus, Licentiate of Canon Law
- JJ — Judges or Justices, plural
- KC – King's Counsel (United Kingdom and Commonwealth)
- QC – Queen's Counsel (United Kingdom and Commonwealth)
- VC or V-C – Postnominals of the Vice-Chancellor of the High Court (England and Wales)

== Short-form ==
=== A ===
- a/a/o — as assignee of
- ad., ads., adsm., adj. — ad sectam (Latin), at the suit of. Used in colonial and Federal Era American cases when the defendant is listed first; e.g., "John Doe v. Richard Roe" is labeled "Richard Roe ads. John Doe." The long script "S" of the period often makes this appear as "adj."
- Aff'd – affirmed
- Anor — Another
- Anors — Others
- Art. – Article
- Artt. – Articles
- Ass'n — Association
- Atty — Attorney

=== B ===
- b/o — behalf of, on behalf of; see also o/b/o

=== C ===
- c. — Canon or chapter
- cc. — Canons or chapters
- Cert. — Certiorari (appeal to a higher court)
- Co. — company
- Corp. — Corporation
- C — Contract

=== D ===
- Δ (Greek letter delta) or D — Defendant
- d/b/a — doing business as
- Decr. — decree
- Dist. Ct. — district court

=== E ===
- Esq. — Esquire
- et al. — et alia, Latin for "and others" (occasionally written, "et als")
- et seq. — et sequens, Latin for "and following"
- ex. p. — Ex parte (United Kingdom)

=== F ===
- f/k/a — formerly known as

=== H ===
- H. Ct. — High Court

=== I ===
- Id. — "idem," Latin for "the same"
- Inc. — Incorporated
- Ins. — insurance
- Instr. — Instructio, a kind of decree (canon law)
- In re – in the matter of (United States)
- Int'l — international

=== K ===
- K — Contract

=== N ===
- Nat'l — national
- n/k/a — Now Known As

=== O ===
- oao – on the application of (United Kingdom)
- o/b/o — on behalf of
- Opp'n — opposition
- Org. — organization
- Ors — "Others" (see also, Anor, Anors)

=== P ===
- ¶ (Pilcrow) — Paragraph
- Π (Greek letter Pi) — Plaintiff
- p. — Page
- pp. — Pages
- Prae. — Praenotanda
- Pty – proprietary company
- Pub.L. — Public Law

=== Q ===
- QDRO — Qualified Domestic Relations Order

=== R ===
- R — Rex or Regina
- Re – In re (United Kingdom and Commonwealth)
- Reh'g — Rehearing
- Relv. — Relevant
- Rescr. — Rescriptum
- Resp. — Responsum
- Resp't — Respondent
- Rev'd — reversed

=== S ===
- § or s. — Section
- §§ ss. — Multiple Sections
- Sarl - Société à responsabilité limitée or Sociedade anónima de responsabilidade limitada (limited company)
- sc. — scilicet
- sd — said

=== T ===
- ™ or TM — Trademark (such as a word or phrase identifying a company or product)

=== V ===
- v. — versus. Used when plaintiff is listed first on a case title. John Doe v. Richard Roe.

=== W ===
- WOP or w/o/p — without prejudice

=== X ===
- XFD — Examination for Discovery
- XN — Examination in Chief
- XXN — Cross-examination

== See also ==
- List of legal abbreviations (canon law)
