= ELR =

ELR may refer to:

== Transportation ==
- East Lancashire Railway, a heritage railway in England
- East Lancashire Railway (1844–1859), a former railway in the northwest of England
- East London Railway, see East London Line
- Engineer's Line Reference, an abbreviated code for a section of rail route in the UK
- Cadillac ELR, a luxury hybrid compact coupé

== Other ==
- Employer of last resort, a formal government job guarantee program
- Environmental lapse rate, a term in meteorology
- The Environmental Law Reporter, a publication by the Environmental Law Institute
- Enzyme-linked receptor, a category of receptors involved in cell signalling
- ExtraLife Radio, a radio show created and hosted by cartoonist Scott Johnson
- European Law Reporter, a specialist journal
- Everybody Loves Raymond, an American TV sitcom (1996–2005)
