= Pha (Indic) =

Letter "Pha" in Indic scripts

Example glyphs
- Bengali–Assamese: Pha
- Tibetan: Pha
- Thai: ผ
- Malayalam: ഫ
- Sinhala: ඵ
- Ashoka Brahmi: Pha
- Devanagari: Pha

Cognates
- Hebrew: פ ,ף
- Greek: Π
- Latin: P
- Cyrillic: П

Properties
- Phonemic representation: /pʰ/
- IAST transliteration: ph Ph
- ISCII code point: C9 (201)

Pha is a consonant of Indic abugidas. In modern Indic scripts, Pha is derived from the early "Ashoka" Brahmi letter after having gone through the Gupta letter. The letter is probably derived from the Aramaic Pe, and is thus related to the modern Latin P and Greek Pi.

== Āryabhaṭa numeration ==
Aryabhata used Devanagari letters for numbers, very similar to the Greek numerals, even after the invention of Indian numerals. The values of the different forms of फ are:

- फ [pʰə] = 22 (२२)
- फि [pʰɪ] = 2,200 (२ २००)
- फु [pʰʊ] = 220,000 (२ २० ०००)
- फृ [pʰri] = 22,000,000 (२ २० ०० ०००)
- फॢ [pʰlə] = 22×10^{8} (२२×१०^{८})
- फे [pʰe] = 22×10^{10} (२२×१०^{१०})
- फै [pʰɛː] = 22×10^{12} (२२×१०^{१२})
- फो [pʰoː] = 22×10^{14} (२२×१०^{१४})
- फौ [pʰɔː] = 22×10^{16} (२२×१०^{१६})

== Historic Pha ==
There are three different general early historic scripts - Brahmi and its variants, Kharoṣṭhī, and Tocharian, the so-called slanting Brahmi. Pha as found in standard Brahmi, was a simple geometric shape, with variations toward more flowing forms by the Gupta. The Tocharian Pha did not have an alternate Fremdzeichen form. The third form of pha, in Kharoshthi was probably derived from Aramaic separately from the Brahmi letter.

=== Brahmi Pha ===
The Brahmi letter, Pha, is probably derived from the altered Aramaic Pe, and is thus related to the modern Latin P and Greek Pi. Several identifiable styles of writing the Brahmi Pha can be found, most associated with a specific set of inscriptions from an artifact or diverse records from an historic period. As the earliest and most geometric style of Brahmi, the letters found on the Edicts of Ashoka and other records from around that time are normally the reference form for Brahmi letters, with vowel marks not attested until later forms of Brahmi back-formed to match the geometric writing style.

Brahmi Pha historic forms
Ashoka (3rd-1st c. BCE)	Girnar (~150 BCE)	Kushana (~150-250 CE)	Gujarat (~250 CE)	Gupta (~350 CE)
	No sample	No sample		

=== Tocharian Pha ===
The Tocharian letter is derived from the Brahmi, but does not have an alternate Fremdzeichen form.

Tocharian Pha with vowel marks
Pha	Phā	Phi	Phī	Phu	Phū	Phr	Phr̄	Phe	Phai	Pho	Phau	Phä

=== Kharoṣṭhī Pha ===
The Kharoṣṭhī letter is generally accepted as being derived from the altered Aramaic Pe, and is thus related to P and Pi, in addition to the Brahmi Pha.

== Devanagari Pha ==
Pha (फ) is a consonant of the Devanagari abugida. It ultimately arose from the Brahmi letter, after having gone through the Gupta letter. Letters that derive from it are the Gujarati letter ફ, and the Modi letter 𑘣.

=== Devanagari-using Languages ===
In all languages, फ is pronounced as [pʰə] or [pʰ] when appropriate. Like all Indic scripts, Devanagari uses vowel marks attached to the base consonant to override the inherent /ə/ vowel:

Devanagari फ with vowel marks
Pha	Phā	Phi	Phī	Phu	Phū	Phr	Phr̄	Phl	Phl̄	Phe	Phai	Pho	Phau	Ph
फ	फा	फि	फी	फु	फू	फृ	फॄ	फॢ	फॣ	फे	फै	फो	फौ	फ्

=== Conjuncts with फ ===
Half form of Pha.

Devanagari exhibits conjunct ligatures, as is common in Indic scripts. In modern Devanagari texts, most conjuncts are formed by reducing the letter shape to fit tightly to the following letter, sometimes referred to as a "half form". Most Devanagari letters drop a character's vertical stem to create a half form, but due to its large tail to the right of the stem, the common half form of फ has its tail reduced to attach to the following letter. Some conjunct clusters are always represented by a true ligature, instead of a shape that can be broken into constituent independent letters. Vertically stacked conjuncts are ubiquitous in older texts, while only a few are still used routinely in modern Devanagari texts. The use of ligatures and vertical conjuncts may vary across languages using the Devanagari script, with Marathi in particular preferring the use of half forms where texts in other languages would show ligatures and vertical stacks.

==== Ligature conjuncts of फ ====
True ligatures are quite rare in Indic scripts. The most common ligated conjuncts in Devanagari are in the form of a slight mutation to fit in context or as a consistent variant form appended to the adjacent characters. Those variants include Na and the Repha and Rakar forms of Ra. Nepali and Marathi texts use the "eyelash" Ra half form for an initial "R" instead of repha.

- Repha र্ (r) + फ (pʰa) gives the ligature rpʰa: ^{note}

- Eyelash र্ (r) + फ (pʰa) gives the ligature rpʰa:

- फ্ (pʰ) + न (na) gives the ligature pʰna:

- फ্ (pʰ) + rakar र (ra) gives the ligature pʰra:

==== Stacked conjuncts of फ ====
Vertically stacked ligatures are the most common conjunct forms found in Devanagari text. Although the constituent characters may need to be stretched and moved slightly in order to stack neatly, stacked conjuncts can be broken down into recognizable base letters, or a letter and an otherwise standard ligature.

- छ্ (cʰ) + फ (pʰa) gives the ligature cʰpʰa:

- ढ্ (ḍʱ) + फ (pʰa) gives the ligature ḍʱpʰa:

- ड্ (ḍ) + फ (pʰa) gives the ligature ḍpʰa:

- द্ (d) + फ (pʰa) gives the ligature dpʰa:

- ङ্ (ŋ) + फ (pʰa) gives the ligature ŋpʰa:

- फ্ (pʰ) + ब (ba) gives the ligature pʰba:

- फ্ (pʰ) + च (ca) gives the ligature pʰca:

- फ্ (pʰ) + ड (ḍa) gives the ligature pʰḍa:

- फ্ (pʰ) + ज (ja) gives the ligature pʰja:

- फ্ (pʰ) + ज্ (j) + ञ (ña) gives the ligature pʰjña:

- फ্ (pʰ) + क (ka) gives the ligature pʰka:

- फ্ (pʰ) + ल (la) gives the ligature pʰla:

- फ্ (pʰ) + ङ (ŋa) gives the ligature pʰŋa:

- फ্ (pʰ) + ञ (ña) gives the ligature pʰña:

- फ্ (pʰ) + व (va) gives the ligature pʰva:

- ठ্ (ṭʰ) + फ (pʰa) gives the ligature ṭʰpʰa:

- ट্ (ṭ) + फ (pʰa) gives the ligature ṭpʰa:

== Bengali Pha ==
The Bengali script ফ is derived from the Siddhaṃ, and is marked by a similar horizontal head line, but less geometric shape, than its Devanagari counterpart, फ. The inherent vowel of Bengali consonant letters is /ɔ/, so the bare letter ফ will sometimes be transliterated as "pho" instead of "pha". Adding okar, the "o" vowel mark, gives a reading of /pʰo/. Like all Indic consonants, ফ can be modified by marks to indicate another (or no) vowel than its inherent "a".

Bengali ফ with vowel marks
pha	phā	phi	phī	phu	phū	phr	phr̄	phe	phai	pho	phau	ph
ফ	ফা	ফি	ফী	ফু	ফূ	ফৃ	ফৄ	ফে	ফৈ	ফো	ফৌ	ফ্

=== ফ in Bengali-using languages ===
ফ is used as a basic consonant character in all of the major Bengali script orthographies, including Bengali and Assamese.

=== Conjuncts with ফ ===
Bengali ফ exhibits conjunct ligatures, as is common in Indic scripts, with a tendency towards stacked ligatures.

- ল্ (l) + ফ (pʰa) gives the ligature lpʰa:

- ম্ (m) + ফ (pʰa) gives the ligature mpʰa:

- ফ্ (pʰ) + ল (la) gives the ligature pʰla:

- ফ্ (pʰ) + র (ra) gives the ligature pʰra, with the ra phala suffix:

- র্ (r) + ফ (pʰa) gives the ligature rpʰa, with the repha prefix:

- স্ (s) + ফ (pʰa) gives the ligature spʰa:

- ষ্ (ṣ) + ফ (pʰa) gives the ligature ṣpʰa:

== Gujarati Pha ==
Gujarati Pha.

Pha (ફ) is the twenty-second consonant of the Gujarati abugida. It is derived from the Devanagari Pha with the top bar (shiro rekha) removed, and ultimately the Brahmi letter. ફ (Pha) is similar in appearance to ક (Ka), and care should be taken to avoid confusing the two when reading Gujarati script texts.

=== Gujarati-using Languages ===
The Gujarati script is used to write the Gujarati and Kutchi languages. In both languages, ફ is pronounced as [pʰə] or [pʰ] when appropriate. Like all Indic scripts, Gujarati uses vowel marks attached to the base consonant to override the inherent /ə/ vowel:

Pha	Phā	Phi	Phī	Phu	Phū	Phr	Phl	Phr̄	Phl̄	Phĕ	Phe	Phai	Phŏ	Pho	Phau	Ph
Gujarati Pha syllables, with vowel marks in red.

=== Conjuncts with ફ ===
Gujarati ફ exhibits conjunct ligatures, much like its parent Devanagari Script. While most Gujarati conjuncts can only be formed by reducing the letter shape to create a "half form" that fits tightly to following letter, Pha does not have a half form. A few conjunct clusters can be represented by a true ligature, instead of a shape that can be broken into constituent independent letters, and vertically stacked conjuncts can also be found in Gujarati, although much less commonly than in Devanagari. Lacking a half form, Pha will normally use an explicit virama when forming conjuncts without a true ligature. True ligatures are quite rare in Indic scripts. The most common ligated conjuncts in Gujarati are in the form of a slight mutation to fit in context or as a consistent variant form appended to the adjacent characters. Those variants include Na and the Repha and Rakar forms of Ra.

- ર્ (r) + ફ (pʰa) gives the ligature RPha:

- ફ્ (pʰ) + ર (ra) gives the ligature PhRa:

== Telugu Pha ==
Telugu independent and subjoined Pha.

Pha (ఫ) is a consonant of the Telugu abugida. It ultimately arose from the Brahmi letter. It is closely related to the Kannada letter ಫ. Most Telugu consonants contain a v-shaped headstroke that is related to the horizontal headline found in other Indic scripts, although headstrokes do not connect adjacent letters in Telugu. The headstroke is normally lost when adding vowel matras. Telugu conjuncts are created by reducing trailing letters to a subjoined form that appears below the initial consonant of the conjunct. Many subjoined forms are created by dropping their headline, with many extending the end of the stroke of the main letter body to form an extended tail reaching up to the right of the preceding consonant. This subjoining of trailing letters to create conjuncts is in contrast to the leading half forms of Devanagari and Bengali letters. Ligature conjuncts are not a feature in Telugu, with the only non-standard construction being an alternate subjoined form of Ṣa (borrowed from Kannada) in the KṢa conjunct.

== Malayalam Pha ==
Malayalam letter Pha

Pha (ഫ) is a consonant of the Malayalam abugida. It ultimately arose from the Brahmi letter, via the Grantha letter Pha. Like in other Indic scripts, Malayalam consonants have the inherent vowel "a", and take one of several modifying vowel signs to represent syllables with another vowel or no vowel at all.

Malayalam Pha matras: Pha, Phā, Phi, Phī, Phu, Phū, Phr̥, Phr̥̄, Phl̥, Phl̥̄, Phe, Phē, Phai, Pho, Phō, Phau, and Ph.

=== Conjuncts of ഫ ===
As is common in Indic scripts, Malayalam joins letters together to form conjunct consonant clusters. There are several ways in which conjuncts are formed in Malayalam texts: using a post-base form of a trailing consonant placed under the initial consonant of a conjunct, a combined ligature of two or more consonants joined together, a conjoining form that appears as a combining mark on the rest of the conjunct, the use of an explicit candrakkala mark to suppress the inherent "a" vowel, or a special consonant form called a "chillu" letter, representing a bare consonant without the inherent "a" vowel. Texts written with the modern reformed Malayalam orthography, put̪iya lipi, may favor more regular conjunct forms than older texts in paḻaya lipi, due to changes undertaken in the 1970s by the Government of Kerala.

- പ് (p) + ഫ (pʰa) gives the ligature ppʰa:

== Odia Pha ==
Odia independent and subjoined letter Pha.

Pha (ଫ) is a consonant of the Odia abugida. It ultimately arose from the Brahmi letter, via the Siddhaṃ letter Pha. Like in other Indic scripts, Odia consonants have the inherent vowel "a", and take one of several modifying vowel signs to represent syllables with another vowel or no vowel at all.

Odia Pha with vowel matras
Pha	Phā	Phi	Phī	Phu	Phū	Phr̥	Phr̥̄	Phl̥	Phl̥̄	Phe	Phai	Pho	Phau	Ph
ଫ	ଫା	ଫି	ଫୀ	ଫୁ	ଫୂ	ଫୃ	ଫୄ	ଫୢ	ଫୣ	ଫେ	ଫୈ	ଫୋ	ଫୌ	ଫ୍

=== Conjuncts of ଫ ===
As is common in Indic scripts, Odia joins letters together to form conjunct consonant clusters. The most common conjunct formation is achieved by using a small subjoined form of trailing consonants. Most consonants' subjoined forms are identical to the full form, just reduced in size, although a few drop the curved headline or have a subjoined form not directly related to the full form of the consonant. The second type of conjunct formation is through pure ligatures, where the constituent consonants are written together in a single graphic form. This ligature may be recognizable as being a combination of two characters or it can have a conjunct ligature unrelated to its constituent characters.

- ମ୍ (m) + ଫ (pʰa) gives the ligature mpʰa:

== Kaithi Pha ==
Kaithi consonant and half-form Pha.

Pha (𑂤) is a consonant of the Kaithi abugida. It ultimately arose from the Brahmi letter, via the Siddhaṃ letter Pha. Like in other Indic scripts, Kaithi consonants have the inherent vowel "a", and take one of several modifying vowel signs to represent syllables with another vowel or no vowel at all.

Kaithi Pha with vowel matras
Pha	Phā	Phi	Phī	Phu	Phū	Phe	Phai	Pho	Phau	Ph
𑂤	𑂤𑂰	𑂤𑂱	𑂤𑂲	𑂤𑂳	𑂤𑂴	𑂤𑂵	𑂤𑂶	𑂤𑂷	𑂤𑂸	𑂤𑂹

=== Conjuncts of 𑂤 ===
As is common in Indic scripts, Kaithi joins letters together to form conjunct consonant clusters. The most common conjunct formation is achieved by using a half form of preceding consonants, although several consonants use an explicit virama. Most half forms are derived from the full form by removing the vertical stem. As is common in most Indic scripts, conjuncts of ra are indicated with a repha or rakar mark attached to the rest of the consonant cluster. In addition, there are a few vertical conjuncts that can be found in Kaithi writing, but true ligatures are not used in the modern Kaithi script.

- 𑂩୍ (r) + 𑂤 (pʰa) gives the ligature rpʰa:

== Tirhuta Pha ==
Tirhuta consonant Pha

Pha (𑒤) is a consonant of the Tirhuta abugida. It ultimately arose from the Brahmi letter, via the Siddhaṃ letter Pha. Like in other Indic scripts, Tirhuta consonants have the inherent vowel "a", and take one of several modifying vowel signs to represent sylables with another vowel or no vowel at all.

Tirhuta Pha with vowel matras
Pha	Phā	Phi	Phī	Phu	Phū	Phṛ	Phṝ	Phḷ	Phḹ	Phē	Phe	Phai	Phō	Pho	Phau	Ph
𑒤	𑒤𑒰	𑒤𑒱	𑒤𑒲	𑒤𑒳	𑒤𑒴	𑒤𑒵	𑒤𑒶	𑒤𑒷	𑒤𑒸	𑒤𑒹	𑒤𑒺	𑒤𑒻	𑒤𑒼	𑒤𑒽	𑒤𑒾	𑒤𑓂

=== Conjuncts of 𑒤 ===
As is common in Indic scripts, Tirhuta joins letters together to form conjunct consonant clusters. The most common conjunct formation is achieved by using an explicit virama. As is common in most Indic scripts, conjuncts of ra are indicated with a repha or rakar mark attached to the rest of the consonant cluster. In addition, other consonants take unique combining forms when in conjunct with other letters, and there are several vertical conjuncts and true ligatures that can be found in Tirhuta writing.

- 𑒤୍ (pʰ) + 𑒪 (la) gives the ligature pʰla:

- 𑒤୍ (pʰ) + 𑒢 (na) gives the ligature pʰna:

- 𑒤୍ (pʰ) + 𑒩 (ra) gives the ligature pʰra:

- 𑒤୍ (pʰ) + 𑒫 (va) gives the ligature pʰva:

- 𑒩୍ (r) + 𑒤 (pʰa) gives the ligature rpʰa:

- 𑒞୍ (t) + 𑒤 (pʰa) gives the ligature tpʰa:

== Comparison of Pha ==
The various Indic scripts are generally related to each other through adaptation and borrowing, and as such the glyphs for cognate letters, including Pha, are related as well.

Comparison of Pha in different scripts

Aramaic
Kharoṣṭhī 𐨥	Ashoka Brahmi	Kushana Brahmi (Note: The middle "Kushana" form of Brahmi is a later style that emerged as Brahmi scripts were beginning to proliferate. Gupta Brahmi was definitely a stylistic descendant from Kushana, but other Brahmi-derived scripts may have descended from earlier forms.)	Tocharian (Note: Tocharian is probably derived from the middle period "Kushana" form of Brahmi, although artifacts from that time are not plentiful enough to establish a definite succession.)
Gupta Brahmi	Pallava
Kadamba -
Bhaiksuki 𑰣	Siddhaṃ	Grantha 𑌫	Cham ꨜ
Sinhala ඵ	Pyu / Old Mon (Note: Pyu and Old Mon are probably the precursors of the Burmese script, and may be derived from either the Pallava or Kadamba script) -
Tibetan	Newa 𑐦	Ahom 𑜇	Malayalam ഫ
Telugu ఫ	Burmese ဖ
Lepcha ᰐ	Ranjana	Saurashtra ꢧ	Dives Akuru 𑤡
Kannada ಫ	Kayah Li ꤖ
Limbu ᤑ	Soyombo (Note: May also be derived from Devangari (see bottom left of table)) 𑩱	Khmer ផ	Tamil -
Chakma 𑄜	Tai Tham ᨹ / ᨺ
Meitei Mayek ꯐ	Gaudi -	Thai ผ / ฝ	Lao ຜ / ຝ
Tai Le ᥚ
Marchen 𑱿	Tirhuta 𑒤	New Tai Lue ᦕ / ᦚ	Tai Viet ꪞ / ꪟ	Aksara Kawi
'Phags-pa ꡍ	Odia ଫ	Sharada 𑆦	Rejang -	Batak -	Buginese -
Zanabazar Square 𑨟	Bengali–Assamese	Takri 𑚟	Javanese ꦦ	Balinese ᬨ	Makasar -
Hangul (Note: The Origin of Hangul from 'Phags-pa is one of limited influence, inspiring at most a few basic letter shapes. Hangul does not function as an Indic abugida.) -	Northern Nagari -	Dogri 𑠟	Laṇḍā -	Sundanese -	Baybayin -
Modi 𑘣	Gujarati ફ	Khojki 𑈠	Khudabadi 𑋓	Mahajani 𑅩	Tagbanwa -
Devanagari	Nandinagari 𑧃	Kaithi	Gurmukhi ਫ	Multani 𑊜	Buhid -
Canadian Syllabics (Note: Although the basic letter forms of the Canadian Aboriginal Syllabics were derived from handwritten Devanagari letters, this abugida indicates vowel sounds by rotations of the letter form, rather than the use of vowel diacritics as is standard in Indic abugidas.) -	Soyombo (Note: May also be derived from Ranjana (see above)) 𑩱	Sylheti Nagari ꠚ	Gunjala Gondi 𑶆	Masaram Gondi (Note: Masaram Gondi acts as an Indic abugida, but its letterforms were not derived from any single precursor script.) 𑴡	Hanuno'o -

== Character encodings of Pha ==
Most Indic scripts are encoded in the Unicode Standard, and as such the letter Pha in those scripts can be represented in plain text with unique codepoint. Pha from several modern-use scripts can also be found in legacy encodings, such as ISCII.

Character information
Preview					ఫ		ଫ		ಫ		ഫ		ફ		ਫ	
Unicode name	DEVANAGARI LETTER PHA		BENGALI LETTER PHA		TELUGU LETTER PHA		ORIYA LETTER PHA		KANNADA LETTER PHA		MALAYALAM LETTER PHA		GUJARATI LETTER PHA		GURMUKHI LETTER PHA	
Encodings	decimal	hex	dec	hex	dec	hex	dec	hex	dec	hex	dec	hex	dec	hex	dec	hex
Unicode	2347	U+092B	2475	U+09AB	3115	U+0C2B	2859	U+0B2B	3243	U+0CAB	3371	U+0D2B	2731	U+0AAB	2603	U+0A2B
UTF-8	224 164 171	E0 A4 AB	224 166 171	E0 A6 AB	224 176 171	E0 B0 AB	224 172 171	E0 AC AB	224 178 171	E0 B2 AB	224 180 171	E0 B4 AB	224 170 171	E0 AA AB	224 168 171	E0 A8 AB
Numeric character reference	&#2347;	&#x92B;	&#2475;	&#x9AB;	&#3115;	&#xC2B;	&#2859;	&#xB2B;	&#3243;	&#xCAB;	&#3371;	&#xD2B;	&#2731;	&#xAAB;	&#2603;	&#xA2B;
ISCII	201	C9	201	C9	201	C9	201	C9	201	C9	201	C9	201	C9	201	C9

Character information
Preview	Ashoka Kushana Gupta		𐨥				𑌫	
Unicode name	BRAHMI LETTER PHA		KHAROSHTHI LETTER PHA		SIDDHAM LETTER PHA		GRANTHA LETTER PHA	
Encodings	decimal	hex	dec	hex	dec	hex	dec	hex
Unicode	69672	U+11028	68133	U+10A25	71075	U+115A3	70443	U+1132B
UTF-8	240 145 128 168	F0 91 80 A8	240 144 168 165	F0 90 A8 A5	240 145 150 163	F0 91 96 A3	240 145 140 171	F0 91 8C AB
UTF-16	55300 56360	D804 DC28	55298 56869	D802 DE25	55301 56739	D805 DDA3	55300 57131	D804 DF2B
Numeric character reference	&#69672;	&#x11028;	&#68133;	&#x10A25;	&#71075;	&#x115A3;	&#70443;	&#x1132B;

Character information
Preview			ྥ		ꡍ		𑨟		𑐦		𑰣		𑆦	
Unicode name	TIBETAN LETTER PHA		TIBETAN SUBJOINED LETTER PHA		PHAGS-PA LETTER PHA		ZANABAZAR SQUARE LETTER PHA		NEWA LETTER PHA		BHAIKSUKI LETTER PHA		SHARADA LETTER PHA	
Encodings	decimal	hex	dec	hex	dec	hex	dec	hex	dec	hex	dec	hex	dec	hex
Unicode	3925	U+0F55	4005	U+0FA5	43085	U+A84D	72223	U+11A1F	70694	U+11426	72739	U+11C23	70054	U+111A6
UTF-8	224 189 149	E0 BD 95	224 190 165	E0 BE A5	234 161 141	EA A1 8D	240 145 168 159	F0 91 A8 9F	240 145 144 166	F0 91 90 A6	240 145 176 163	F0 91 B0 A3	240 145 134 166	F0 91 86 A6
UTF-16	3925	0F55	4005	0FA5	43085	A84D	55302 56863	D806 DE1F	55301 56358	D805 DC26	55303 56355	D807 DC23	55300 56742	D804 DDA6
Numeric character reference	&#3925;	&#xF55;	&#4005;	&#xFA5;	&#43085;	&#xA84D;	&#72223;	&#x11A1F;	&#70694;	&#x11426;	&#72739;	&#x11C23;	&#70054;	&#x111A6;

Character information
Preview	ဖ		ᨹ		ᨺ		ᦕ		ᦚ	
Unicode name	MYANMAR LETTER PHA		TAI THAM LETTER HIGH PHA		TAI THAM LETTER HIGH FA		NEW TAI LUE LETTER HIGH PHA		NEW TAI LUE LETTER HIGH FA	
Encodings	decimal	hex	dec	hex	dec	hex	dec	hex	dec	hex
Unicode	4118	U+1016	6713	U+1A39	6714	U+1A3A	6549	U+1995	6554	U+199A
UTF-8	225 128 150	E1 80 96	225 168 185	E1 A8 B9	225 168 186	E1 A8 BA	225 166 149	E1 A6 95	225 166 154	E1 A6 9A
Numeric character reference	&#4118;	&#x1016;	&#6713;	&#x1A39;	&#6714;	&#x1A3A;	&#6549;	&#x1995;	&#6554;	&#x199A;

Character information
Preview	ផ		ຜ		ຝ		ผ		ฝ		ꪞ		ꪟ	
Unicode name	KHMER LETTER PHA		LAO LETTER PHO SUNG		LAO LETTER FO TAM		THAI CHARACTER PHO PHUNG		THAI CHARACTER FO FA		TAI VIET LETTER LOW PHO		TAI VIET LETTER HIGH PHO	
Encodings	decimal	hex	dec	hex	dec	hex	dec	hex	dec	hex	dec	hex	dec	hex
Unicode	6037	U+1795	3740	U+0E9C	3741	U+0E9D	3612	U+0E1C	3613	U+0E1D	43678	U+AA9E	43679	U+AA9F
UTF-8	225 158 149	E1 9E 95	224 186 156	E0 BA 9C	224 186 157	E0 BA 9D	224 184 156	E0 B8 9C	224 184 157	E0 B8 9D	234 170 158	EA AA 9E	234 170 159	EA AA 9F
Numeric character reference	&#6037;	&#x1795;	&#3740;	&#xE9C;	&#3741;	&#xE9D;	&#3612;	&#xE1C;	&#3613;	&#xE1D;	&#43678;	&#xAA9E;	&#43679;	&#xAA9F;

Character information
Preview	ඵ		ꤖ		𑄜		ᥚ		𑜇		𑤡		ꢧ		ꨜ	
Unicode name	SINHALA LETTER MAHAAPRAANA PAYANNA		KAYAH LI LETTER PHA		CHAKMA LETTER PHAA		TAI LE LETTER PHA		AHOM LETTER PHA		DIVES AKURU LETTER PHA		SAURASHTRA LETTER PHA		CHAM LETTER PHA	
Encodings	decimal	hex	dec	hex	dec	hex	dec	hex	dec	hex	dec	hex	dec	hex	dec	hex
Unicode	3509	U+0DB5	43286	U+A916	69916	U+1111C	6490	U+195A	71431	U+11707	71969	U+11921	43175	U+A8A7	43548	U+AA1C
UTF-8	224 182 181	E0 B6 B5	234 164 150	EA A4 96	240 145 132 156	F0 91 84 9C	225 165 154	E1 A5 9A	240 145 156 135	F0 91 9C 87	240 145 164 161	F0 91 A4 A1	234 162 167	EA A2 A7	234 168 156	EA A8 9C
UTF-16	3509	0DB5	43286	A916	55300 56604	D804 DD1C	6490	195A	55301 57095	D805 DF07	55302 56609	D806 DD21	43175	A8A7	43548	AA1C
Numeric character reference	&#3509;	&#xDB5;	&#43286;	&#xA916;	&#69916;	&#x1111C;	&#6490;	&#x195A;	&#71431;	&#x11707;	&#71969;	&#x11921;	&#43175;	&#xA8A7;	&#43548;	&#xAA1C;

Character information
Preview	𑘣		𑧃		𑩱		ꠚ		𑶆			
Unicode name	MODI LETTER PHA		NANDINAGARI LETTER PHA		SOYOMBO LETTER PHA		SYLOTI NAGRI LETTER PHO		GUNJALA GONDI LETTER PHA		KAITHI LETTER PHA	
Encodings	decimal	hex	dec	hex	dec	hex	dec	hex	dec	hex	dec	hex
Unicode	71203	U+11623	72131	U+119C3	72305	U+11A71	43034	U+A81A	73094	U+11D86	69796	U+110A4
UTF-8	240 145 152 163	F0 91 98 A3	240 145 167 131	F0 91 A7 83	240 145 169 177	F0 91 A9 B1	234 160 154	EA A0 9A	240 145 182 134	F0 91 B6 86	240 145 130 164	F0 91 82 A4
UTF-16	55301 56867	D805 DE23	55302 56771	D806 DDC3	55302 56945	D806 DE71	43034	A81A	55303 56710	D807 DD86	55300 56484	D804 DCA4
Numeric character reference	&#71203;	&#x11623;	&#72131;	&#x119C3;	&#72305;	&#x11A71;	&#43034;	&#xA81A;	&#73094;	&#x11D86;	&#69796;	&#x110A4;

Character information
Preview	𑒤		ᰐ		ᤑ		ꯐ		𑱿	
Unicode name	TIRHUTA LETTER PHA		LEPCHA LETTER PHA		LIMBU LETTER PHA		MEETEI MAYEK LETTER PHAM		MARCHEN LETTER PHA	
Encodings	decimal	hex	dec	hex	dec	hex	dec	hex	dec	hex
Unicode	70820	U+114A4	7184	U+1C10	6417	U+1911	43984	U+ABD0	72831	U+11C7F
UTF-8	240 145 146 164	F0 91 92 A4	225 176 144	E1 B0 90	225 164 145	E1 A4 91	234 175 144	EA AF 90	240 145 177 191	F0 91 B1 BF
UTF-16	55301 56484	D805 DCA4	7184	1C10	6417	1911	43984	ABD0	55303 56447	D807 DC7F
Numeric character reference	&#70820;	&#x114A4;	&#7184;	&#x1C10;	&#6417;	&#x1911;	&#43984;	&#xABD0;	&#72831;	&#x11C7F;

Character information
Preview	𑚟		𑠟		𑈠		𑋓		𑅩		𑊜	
Unicode name	TAKRI LETTER PHA		DOGRA LETTER PHA		KHOJKI LETTER PHA		KHUDAWADI LETTER PHA		MAHAJANI LETTER PHA		MULTANI LETTER PHA	
Encodings	decimal	hex	dec	hex	dec	hex	dec	hex	dec	hex	dec	hex
Unicode	71327	U+1169F	71711	U+1181F	70176	U+11220	70355	U+112D3	69993	U+11169	70300	U+1129C
UTF-8	240 145 154 159	F0 91 9A 9F	240 145 160 159	F0 91 A0 9F	240 145 136 160	F0 91 88 A0	240 145 139 147	F0 91 8B 93	240 145 133 169	F0 91 85 A9	240 145 138 156	F0 91 8A 9C
UTF-16	55301 56991	D805 DE9F	55302 56351	D806 DC1F	55300 56864	D804 DE20	55300 57043	D804 DED3	55300 56681	D804 DD69	55300 56988	D804 DE9C
Numeric character reference	&#71327;	&#x1169F;	&#71711;	&#x1181F;	&#70176;	&#x11220;	&#70355;	&#x112D3;	&#69993;	&#x11169;	&#70300;	&#x1129C;

Character information
Preview	ᬨ		ꦦ	
Unicode name	BALINESE LETTER PA KAPAL		JAVANESE LETTER PA MURDA	
Encodings	decimal	hex	dec	hex
Unicode	6952	U+1B28	43430	U+A9A6
UTF-8	225 172 168	E1 AC A8	234 166 166	EA A6 A6
Numeric character reference	&#6952;	&#x1B28;	&#43430;	&#xA9A6;

Character information
Preview	𑴡	
Unicode name	MASARAM GONDI LETTER PHA	
Encodings	decimal	hex
Unicode	72993	U+11D21
UTF-8	240 145 180 161	F0 91 B4 A1
UTF-16	55303 56609	D807 DD21
Numeric character reference	&#72993;	&#x11D21;
