= Ka (Indic) =

Letter "Ka" in Indic scripts

Example glyphs
- Bengali–Assamese: Ka
- Tibetan: Ka
- Tamil: Ka
- Thai: ก
- Malayalam: ക
- Sinhala: ක
- Ashoka Brahmi: Ka
- Devanagari: Ka

Cognates
- Hebrew: כ ,ך
- Greek: Κ
- Latin: K
- Cyrillic: К

Properties
- Phonemic representation: /k/
- IAST transliteration: ka Ka
- ISCII code point: B3 (179)

Ka is the first consonant of the Indic abugidas. In modern Indic scripts, ka is derived from the Brāhmī letter, which is (according to the Semitic hypothesis) derived from the Aramaic ("K").

== Mathematics ==
=== Āryabhaṭa numeration ===
Aryabhata used Devanāgarī letters for numbers, very similar to the Greek numerals, even after the invention of Indian numerals. The values of the different forms of क are:

- क [kə] = 1 (१)
- कि [ki] = 100 (१००)
- कु [ku] = 10,000 (१० ०००)
- कृ [kr̩] = 1,000,000 (१० ०० ०००)
- कॢ [kl̩] = 1×10^{8} (१०^{८})
- के [keː] = 1×10^{10} (१०^{१०})
- कै [kəi̯] = 1×10^{12} (१०^{१२})
- को [koː] = 1×10^{14} (१०^{१४})
- कौ [kəu̯] = 1×10^{16} (१०^{१६})

== Tabla Strokes ==
In Tabla notation, क (ka) also seen as कि (ki), or के (ke) is a flat, nonresonant stroke of the left hand. The heel of the hand is left on the drum, while the hand rotates to hit the drum, with the focus of the force being focused between the tips and first joints of the fingers.

== Hindu astrology ==
के (ke) is the abbreviation used for केतु (Ketu), the descending lunar node. In Hindu astrology, Ketu represents karmic collections both good and bad, spirituality, and supernatural influences. Ketu is associated with the Matsya Avatar (Fish Incarnation) of Vishnu. Ketu signifies the spiritual process of the refinement of materialization to spirit and is considered both malefic and benefic, as it causes sorrow and loss, and yet at the same time turns the individual to God. In other words, it causes material loss in order to force a more spiritual outlook in the person. Ketu is a karaka or indicator of intelligence, wisdom, non-attachment, fantasy, penetrating insight, derangement, and psychic abilities. Ketu is believed to bring prosperity to the devotee's family, removes the effects of snakebite and illness arising out of poisons. He grants good health, wealth and cattle to his devotees.

== Historic Ka ==
There are three different general early historic scripts - Brāhmī and its variants, Kharoṣṭhī, and Tocharian, the so-called slanting Brahmi. Ka as found in standard Brahmi, was based on a simple "+" shape, with slight variations toward the Gupta. The Tocharian Ka had an alternate Fremdzeichen form,. The third form of Ka, in Kharoṣṭhī (𐨐) was probably derived from Aramaic separately from the Brahmi letter.

=== Brahmi Ka ===
The Brahmi letter, ka, is probably derived from the Aramaic Kaph, and is thus related to the modern Latin K and Greek Kappa. Several identifiable styles of writing the Brahmi Ka can be found, most associated with a specific set of inscriptions from an artifact or diverse records from an historic period. As the earliest and most geometric style of Brahmi, the letters found on the Edicts of Ashoka and other records from around that time are normally the reference form for Brahmi letters, with vowel marks not attested until later forms of Brahmi back-formed to match the geometric writing style.

Brahmi Ka historic forms
Ashoka (3rd-1st c. BCE)	Girnar (~150 BCE)	Kushana (~150-250 CE)	Gujarat (~250 CE)	Gupta (~350 CE)

Ashoka Brahmi Ka with vowel marks
K	Ka	Kā	Ki	Kī	Ku	Kū	Kr	Kr̄	Kl	Kl̄	Ke	Kai	Ko	Kau

=== Tocharian Ka ===
The Tocharian letteris derived from the Brahmi, and has an alternate Fremdzeichen formused in conjuncts and as an alternate representation of Kä.

Tocharian Ka with vowel marks
Ka	Kā	Ki	Kī	Ku	Kū	Kr	Kr̄	Ke	Kai	Ko	Kau	Kä	Fremdzeichen
													kä

=== Kharoshthi Ka ===
The Kharoshthi letter is generally accepted as being derived from the Aramaic Kaph, and is thus related to K and Kappa, in addition to the Brahmi ka.

== Devanagari Ka ==
Ka (क) (कवर्ण kavarn) is the first consonant of the Devanagari abugida. It ultimately arose from the Brahmi letter, after having gone through the Gupta letter. Letters that derive from it are the Gujarati letter ક, and the Modi letter 𑘎.

=== Devanagari-using Languages ===
In all languages, क is pronounced as [kə] or [k] when appropriate.

- कमल = kamal [kə.məl] "lotus"

In this example, क implements its inherent vowel, the schwa.

- सड़क = saṛak [sə.ɽək] "road"

In this example, क deletes the inherent schwa for correct pronunciation. Certain words that have been borrowed from Persian and Arabic implement the nuqta to more properly approximate the original word. It is then transliterated as a q.

- क़दम = qadam [qəd̪əm] "footstep"

=== क matras ===
Like other Devnagari consonants, the inherent vowel of क can be altered by the addition of vowel marks, called "matras". In addition, several other diacritics can be used to alter the base consonant or append sounds to the syllable.

=== Conjuncts With क ===
Half form of Ka.

Devanagari exhibits conjunct ligatures, as is common in Indic scripts. In modern Devanagari texts, most conjuncts are formed by reducing the letter shape to fit tightly to the following letter, sometimes referred to as a "half form". Most Devanagari letters drop a character's vertical stem to create a half form, but due to its large tail to the right of the stem, the common half form of क has its tail reduced to attach to the following letter. Some conjunct clusters are always represented by a true ligature, instead of a shape that can be broken into constituent independent letters. Vertically stacked conjuncts are ubiquitous in older texts, while only a few are still used routinely in modern Devanagari texts. The use of ligatures and vertical conjuncts may vary across languages using the Devanagari script, with Marathi in particular preferring the use of half forms where texts in other languages would show ligatures and vertical stacks.

==== Ligature conjuncts of क ====
True ligatures are quite rare in Indic scripts. The most common ligated conjuncts in Devanagari are in the form of a slight mutation to fit in context or as a consistent variant form appended to the adjacent characters. Those variants include Na and the Repha and Rakar forms of Ra. Nepali and Marathi texts use the "eyelash" Ra half form for an initial "R" instead of repha.

- Repha र্ (r) + क (ka) gives the ligature rka: ^{note}

- Eyelash र্ (r) + क (ka) gives the ligature rka:

- क্ (k) + rakar र (ra) gives the ligature kra:

- ङ্ (ŋ) + क্ (k) + rakar र (ra) gives the ligature ŋkra:

- क্ (k) + न (na) gives the ligature kna:

- क্ (k) + त (ta) gives the ligature kta:

- क্ (k) + त্ (t) + rakar र (ra) gives the ligature ktra:

- क্ (k) + त্ (t) + व (va) gives the ligature ktva:

- ङ্ (ŋ) + क্ (k) + त (ta) gives the ligature ŋkta:

==== Devanagari Kṣa ====
Kṣa half form

One of the most common true ligatures in Devanagari is the conjunct kṣa क्ष. This ligature is a required form for most Devanagari languages, and the conjunct even has its own half form that freely joins other letters in horizontal conjuncts.

- क্ (k) + ष (ṣa) gives the ligature kṣa:

- Repha र্ (r) + क্ (k) + ष (ṣa) gives the ligature rkṣa:

- Eyelash र্ (r) + क্ (k) + ष (ṣa) gives the ligature rkṣa:

- छ্ (cʰ) + क্ (k) + ष (ṣa) gives the ligature cʰkṣa:

- ढ্ (ḍʱ) + क্ (k) + ष (ṣa) gives the ligature ḍʱkṣa:

- ड্ (ḍ) + क্ (k) + ष (ṣa) gives the ligature ḍkṣa:

- द্ (d) + क্ (k) + ष (ṣa) gives the ligature dkṣa:

- ङ্ (ŋ) + क্ (k) + ष (ṣa) gives the ligature ŋkṣa:

- ङ্ (ŋ) + क্ (k) + ष্ (ṣ) + य (ya) gives the ligature ŋkṣya:

- ट্ (ṭ) + क্ (k) + ष (ṣa) gives the ligature ṭkṣa:

- ठ্ (ṭʰ) + क্ (k) + ष (ṣa) gives the ligature ṭʰkṣa:

==== Stacked conjuncts of क ====
Vertically stacked ligatures are the most common conjunct forms found in Devanagari text. Although the constituent characters may need to be stretched and moved slightly in order to stack neatly, stacked conjuncts can be broken down into recognizable base letters, or a letter and an otherwise standard ligature.

- ब্ (b) + क (ka) gives the ligature bka:

- छ্ (cʰ) + क (ka) gives the ligature cʰka:

- च্ (c) + क (ka) gives the ligature cka:

- ढ্ (ḍʱ) + क (ka) gives the ligature ḍʱka:

- ड্ (ḍ) + क (ka) gives the ligature ḍka:

- द্ (d) + क (ka) gives the ligature dka:

- ह্ (h) + क (ka) gives the ligature hka:

- क্ (k) + ब (ba) gives the ligature kba:

- क্ (k) + च (ca) gives the ligature kca:

- क্ (k) + ड (ḍa) gives the ligature kḍa:

- ख্ (kʰ) + क (ka) gives the ligature kʰka:

- क্ (k) + ज (ja) gives the ligature kja:

- क্ (k) + ज্ (j) + ञ (ña) gives the ligature kjña:

- क্ (k) + क (ka) gives the ligature kka:

- क্ (k) + ल (la) gives the ligature kla:

- क্ (k) + ङ (ŋa) gives the ligature kŋa:

- क্ (k) + ञ (ña) gives the ligature kña:

- क্ (k) + व (va) gives the ligature kva:

- ळ্ (ḷ) + क (ka) gives the ligature ḷka:

- ङ্ (ŋ) + क (ka) gives the ligature ŋka:

- फ্ (pʰ) + क (ka) gives the ligature pʰka:

- ठ্ (ṭʰ) + क (ka) gives the ligature ṭʰka:

- ट্ (ṭ) + क (ka) gives the ligature ṭka:

- व্ (v) + क (ka) gives the ligature vka:

== Bengali-Assamese Ka ==
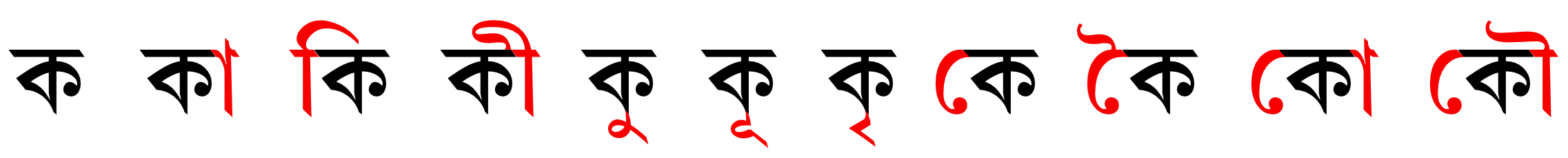
The Bengali-Assamese script ক is derived from the Siddhaṃ, and is marked by a similar horizontal head line, but less geometric shape, than its Devanagari counterpart, क. The inherent vowel of Bengali consonant letters is /ɔ/, so the bare letter ক will sometimes be transliterated as "ko" instead of "ka". Adding okar, the "o" vowel mark, কো, gives a reading of /ko/. Like all Indic consonants, ক can be modified by marks to indicate another (or no) vowel than its inherent "a".

=== ক in Bengali-using languages ===
ক is used as a basic consonant character in all of the major Bengali script orthographies, including Bengali and Assamese. It is also used with a nukta, ক়, for foreign borrowings of /q/.

=== Conjuncts with ক ===
Bengali ক exhibits conjunct ligatures, as is common in Indic scripts, with a tendency towards stacked ligatures.

==== Conjuncts in Kssa ক্ষ ====
The most important conjunct of ক is the irregular kṣa ligature ক্ + ষ [ṣ] = ক্ষ. This conjunct not only has a special form in all Bengali alphabets, it even functions as an independent letter in the Assamese orthography. This ক্ষ conjunct forms regular conjuncts with other letters, keeping its distinct form:

- ক্ষ (kṣ) + ম (ma) gives the ligature kṣma:

- ক্ষ (kṣ) + ম্ (m) + য (ya) gives the ligature kṣmya, with the ya phala suffix:

- ক্ষ (kṣ) + ন (na) gives the ligature kṣna:

- ক্ষ (kṣ) + ব (va) gives the ligature kṣva, with the va phala suffix:

- ক্ষ (kṣ) + য (ya) gives the ligature kṣya, with the ya phala suffix:

==== Other conjuncts of ক ====
- ক্ (k) + র (ra) gives the ligature kra, with a variant ligature instead of a ra phala suffix:

- ঙ (ng) + ক্ (k) + র (ra) gives the conjunct ngkra, with a variant of the kra ligature:

- স্ (s) + ক্ (k) + র (ra) gives the conjunct skra, with the kra ligature:

- ষ্ (ṣ) + ক্ (k) + র (ra) gives the conjunct ṣkra, with the kra ligature:

- ক্ (k) + ক (ka) gives the ligature kka:

- ক্ (k) + ল (la) gives the ligature kla:

- ক্ (k) + ম (ma) gives the ligature kma:

- ক্ (k) + স (sa) gives the ligature ksa:

- ক্ (k) + ত (ta) gives the ligature kta:

- ক্ (k) + ত্ (t) + র (ra) gives the ligature ktra, with the ra phala suffix:

- ক্ (k) + ট (ṭa) gives the ligature kṭa:

- ক্ (k) + ট্ (ṭ) + র (ra) gives the ligature kṭra, with the ra phala suffix:

- ক্ (k) + ব (va) gives the ligature kva, with the va phala suffix:

- ক্ (k) + য (ya) gives the ligature kya, with the ya phala suffix:

- ল্ (l) + ক (ka) gives the ligature lka:

- ল্ (l) + ক্ (k) + য (ya) gives the ligature lkya, with the ya phala suffix:

- ঙ (ng) + ক (ka) gives the ligature ngka:

- ঙ (ng) + ক্ (k) + শ (ʃa) gives the ligature ngkʃa:

- ঙ (ng) + ক্ (k) + য (ya) gives the ligature ngkya, with the ya phala suffix:

- র্ (r) + ক (ka) gives the ligature rka, with the repha prefix:

- র্ (r) + ক্ (k) + য (ya) gives the ligature rkya, with the repha prefix and ya phala suffix:

- স্ (s) + ক (ka) gives the ligature ska:

- ষ্ (ṣ) + ক (ka) gives the ligature ṣka:

- ত্ (t) + ক (ka) gives the ligature tka:

== Gujarati Ka ==
Gujarati Ka.

Ka (ક) is the first consonant of the Gujarati abugida. It is derived from the Devanagari Ka, and ultimately the Brahmi letter. ક (Ka) is similar in appearance to ફ (Pha), and care should be taken to avoid confusing the two when reading Gujarati script texts.

=== Gujarati-using Languages ===
The Gujarati script is used to write the Gujarati and Kutchi languages. In both languages, ક is pronounced as [kə] or [k] when appropriate. Like all Indic scripts, Gujarati uses vowel marks attached to the base consonant to override the inherent /ə/ vowel:

Ka	Kā	Ki	Kī	Ku	Kū	Kr	Kl	Kr̄	Kl̄	Kĕ	Ke	Kai	Kŏ	Ko	Kau	K
Gujarati Ka syllables, with vowel marks in red.

=== Conjuncts with ક ===
Gujarati ક exhibits conjunct ligatures, much like its parent Devanagari Script. While most Gujarati conjuncts can only be formed by reducing the letter shape to create a "half form" that fits tightly to following letter, Ka does not have a half form. A few conjunct clusters can be represented by a true ligature, instead of a shape that can be broken into constituent independent letters, and vertically stacked conjuncts can also be found in Gujarati, although much less commonly than in Devanagari. Lacking a half form, Ka will normally use an explicit virama when forming conjuncts without a true ligature. True ligatures are quite rare in Indic scripts. The most common ligated conjuncts in Gujarati are in the form of a slight mutation to fit in context or as a consistent variant form appended to the adjacent characters. Those variants include Na and the Repha and Rakar forms of Ra.

- ક્ (k) + ર (ra) gives the ligature KRa:

- ર્ (r) + ક (ka) gives the ligature RKa:

- ઙ્ (ŋ) + ક (ka) gives the ligature ṄKa:

- ક્ (k) + ષ (ʂa) gives the ligature KṢa:

- ર્ (r) + ક (ka) ષ (ʂa) gives the ligature RKṢa:

- ઙ્ (ŋ) + ક (ka) ષ (ʂa) gives the ligature ṄKṢa:

== Telugu Ka ==
Telugu independent and subjoined Ka.

Ka (క) is the first consonant of the Telugu abugida. It ultimately arose from the Brahmi letter. It is closely related to the Kannada letter ಕ. Most Telugu consonants contain a wedge-shaped headline that is related to the horizontal headline found in other Indic scripts, although headlines do not connect adjacent letters in Telugu.

Telugu independent and subjoined KṢa.

Telugu conjuncts are created by reducing trailing letters to a subjoined form that appears below the initial consonant of the conjunct. Many subjoined forms are created by dropping their headline, with many extending the end of the stroke of the main letter body to form an extended tail reaching up to the right of the preceding consonant. This subjoining of trailing letters to create conjuncts is in contrast to the leading half forms of Devanagari and Bengali letters. Ligature conjuncts are not a feature in Telugu, with the only non-standard construction being an alternate subjoined form of Ṣa (borrowed from Kannada) in the KṢa conjunct.

== Malayalam Ka ==
Malayalam letter Ka

Ka (ക) is a consonant of the Malayalam abugida. It ultimately arose from the Brahmi letter, via the Grantha letter Ka. Like in other Indic scripts, Malayalam consonants have the inherent vowel "a", and take one of several modifying vowel signs to represent syllables with another vowel or no vowel at all.

Malayalam Ka matras: Ka, Kā, Ki, Kī, Ku, Kū, Kr̥, Kr̥̄, Kl̥, Kl̥̄, Ke, Kē, Kai, Ko, Kō, Kau, and K.

=== Conjuncts of ക ===
Malayalam letter Chillu K

As is common in Indic scripts, Malayalam joins letters together to form conjunct consonant clusters. There are several means of forming conjuncts in Malayalam: using a subjoined form of a trailing consonant placed under the initial consonant of a conjunct, a combined ligature of the two consonants joined together, a conjoining form that appears as a combining mark on the rest of the conjunct, the use of an explicit candrakkala mark to suppress the inherent "a" vowel, or a special consonant form called a "chillu" letter, representing a bare consonant without the inherent "a" vowel. Texts written with the modern reformed Malayalam orthography, put̪iya lipi, may favor more regular conjunct forms than older texts in paḻaya lipi, due to changes undertaken in the 1970s by the Government of Kerala.

- ല് (l) + ക (ka) gives the ligature lka:

- യ് (y) + ക (ka) gives the ligature yka:

- ങ് (ŋ) + ക (ka) gives the ligature ŋka:

- ക് (k) + ക (ka) gives the ligature kka:

- ഴ് (lll) + ക (ka) gives the ligature lllka:

- ക് (k) + ട (ṭa) gives the ligature kṭa:

- ക് (k) + ണ (ṇa) gives the ligature kṇa:

- ക് (k) + ത (ta) gives the ligature kta:

- ക് (k) + ന (na) gives the ligature kna:

- ക് (k) + മ (ma) gives the ligature kma:

- ക് (k) + ര (ra) gives the ligature kra:

- ക് (k) + സ (sa) gives the ligature ksa:

- ക് (k) + ഷ (ṣa) gives the ligature kṣa:

- ക് (k) + ഷ് (ṣ) + ണ (ṇa) gives the ligature kṣṇa:

- ക് (k) + ഷ് (ṣ) + മ (ma) gives the ligature kṣma:

- ക് (k) + ഷ് (ṣ) + ല (la) gives the ligature kṣla:

== Odia Ka ==
Odia independent and subjoined letter Ka.

Ka (କ) is a consonant of the Odia abugida. It ultimately arose from the Brahmi letter, via the Siddhaṃ letter Ka. Like in other Indic scripts, Odia consonants have the inherent vowel "a", and take one of several modifying vowel signs to represent syllables with another vowel or no vowel at all.

Odia Ka with vowel matras
Ka	Kā	Ki	Kī	Ku	Kū	Kr̥	Kr̥̄	Kl̥	Kl̥̄	Ke	Kai	Ko	Kau	K
କ	କା	କି	କୀ	କୁ	କୂ	କୃ	କୄ	କୢ	କୣ	କେ	କୈ	କୋ	କୌ	କ୍

=== Conjuncts of କ ===
As is common in Indic scripts, Odia joins letters together to form conjunct consonant clusters. The most common conjunct formation is achieved by using a small subjoined form of trailing consonants. Most consonants' subjoined forms are identical to the full form, just reduced in size, although a few drop the curved headline or have a subjoined form not directly related to the full form of the consonant. The second type of conjunct formation is through pure ligatures, where the constituent consonants are written together in a single graphic form. This ligature may be recognizable as being a combination of two characters or it can have a conjunct ligature unrelated to its constituent characters.

- ଙ୍ (ŋ) + କ (ka) gives the ligature ŋka:

- ତ୍ (t) + କ (ka) gives the ligature tka:

- ର୍ (r) + କ (ka) gives the ligature rka:

- କ୍ (k) + ର (ra) gives the ligature kra:

=== Odia Kṣa କ୍ଷ ===
Odia independent and subjoined KSsa.

Although ostensibly a conjunct of Ka and Ssa, Odia କ୍ଷ (Kṣa) is largely treated as an independent letter pronounced /kʰjɔ/. Unlike other Odia conjuncts, କ୍ଷ can be found as an independent letter subjoined to another letter or conjunct.

- ତ୍ (t) + କ୍ (ka) + ଷ (ṣa) gives the ligature tkṣa:

== Meitei Mayek Kok ==
Meitei regular and lonsum forms of Kok.

The Meitei letter Kok (Manipuri: head) has the phonetic value /ka/, and like in other Indic scripts, it takes vowel matras to alter its inherent vowel. Unlike in other Indic scripts, it has a special "lonsum" form for indicating a syllable coda consonant sound, while an explicit killer apun iyek, is optionally used to indicate a consonant cluster.

Much like the Tibetan script from which it derives, the Meitei script, used to write the Manipuri language of far eastern India has remnants of the headline common in other Indic scripts in many of its letters, but does not connect the headlines of adjacent letters. Historically, Meitei exhibited conjoining behavior, but this is not a behavior of Meitei letters in modern usage.

== Kaithi Ka ==
Kaithi consonant and half-form Ka.

Ka (𑂍) is a consonant of the Kaithi abugida. It ultimately arose from the Brahmi letter, via the Siddhaṃ letter Ka. Like in other Indic scripts, Kaithi consonants have the inherent vowel "a", and take one of several modifying vowel signs to represent syllables with another vowel or no vowel at all.

Kaithi Ka with vowel matras
Ka	Kā	Ki	Kī	Ku	Kū	Ke	Kai	Ko	Kau	K
𑂍	𑂍𑂰	𑂍𑂱	𑂍𑂲	𑂍𑂳	𑂍𑂴	𑂍𑂵	𑂍𑂶	𑂍𑂷	𑂍𑂸	𑂍𑂹

=== Conjuncts of 𑂍 ===
As is common in Indic scripts, Kaithi joins letters together to form conjunct consonant clusters. The most common conjunct formation is achieved by using a half form of preceding consonants, although several consonants use an explicit virama. Most half forms are derived from the full form by removing the vertical stem. As is common in most Indic scripts, conjuncts of ra are indicated with a repha or rakar mark attached to the rest of the consonant cluster. In addition, there are a few vertical conjuncts that can be found in Kaithi writing, but true ligatures are not used in the modern Kaithi script.

- 𑂍୍ (k) + 𑂩 (ra) gives the ligature kra:

- 𑂩୍ (r) + 𑂍 (ka) gives the ligature rka:

- 𑂍୍ (k) + 𑂍 (ka) gives the ligature kka:

== Tirhuta Ka ==
Tirhuta consonant Ka

Ka (𑒏) is a consonant of the Tirhuta abugida. It ultimately arose from the Brahmi letter, via the Siddhaṃ letter Ka. Like in other Indic scripts, Tirhuta consonants have the inherent vowel "a", and take one of several modifying vowel signs to represent sylables with another vowel or no vowel at all.

Tirhuta Ka with vowel matras
Ka	Kā	Ki	Kī	Ku	Kū	Kṛ	Kṝ	Kḷ	Kḹ	Kē	Ke	Kai	Kō	Ko	Kau	K
𑒏	𑒏𑒰	𑒏𑒱	𑒏𑒲	𑒏𑒳	𑒏𑒴	𑒏𑒵	𑒏𑒶	𑒏𑒷	𑒏𑒸	𑒏𑒹	𑒏𑒺	𑒏𑒻	𑒏𑒼	𑒏𑒽	𑒏𑒾	𑒏𑓂

=== Conjuncts of 𑒏 ===
As is common in Indic scripts, Tirhuta joins letters together to form conjunct consonant clusters. The most common conjunct formation is achieved by using an explicit virama. As is common in most Indic scripts, conjuncts of ra are indicated with a repha or rakar mark attached to the rest of the consonant cluster. In addition, other consonants take unique combining forms when in conjunct with other letters, and there are several vertical conjuncts and true ligatures that can be found in Tirhuta writing.

- 𑒏୍ (k) + 𑒪 (la) gives the ligature kla:

- 𑒏 (k) + 𑒇 (ṛ) gives the ligature kṛ:

- 𑒏୍ (k) + 𑒩 (ra) gives the ligature kra:

- 𑒏୍ (k) + 𑒭 (ṣa) gives the ligature kṣa:

- 𑒏 (k) + 𑒅 (u) gives the ligature ku:

- 𑒏 (k) + 𑒆 (ū) gives the ligature kū:

- 𑒏୍ (k) + 𑒫 (va) gives the ligature kva:

- 𑒓୍ (ŋ) + 𑒏 (ka) gives the ligature ŋka:

- 𑒩୍ (r) + 𑒏 (ka) gives the ligature rka:

- 𑒩୍ (r) + 𑒏୍ (k) + 𑒭 (ṣa) gives the ligature rkṣa:

- 𑒭୍ (ṣ) + 𑒏 (ka) gives the ligature ṣka:

- 𑒞୍ (t) + 𑒏 (ka) gives the ligature tka:

== Comparison of Ka glyphs ==
The various Indic scripts are generally related to each other through adaptation and borrowing, and as such the glyphs for cognate letters, including Ka, are related as well.

Comparison of Ka in different scripts

Aramaic
Kharoṣṭhī 𐨐	Ashoka Brahmi	Kushana Brahmi (Note: The middle "Kushana" form of Brahmi is a later style that emerged as Brahmi scripts were beginning to proliferate. Gupta Brahmi was definitely a stylistic descendant from Kushana, but other Brahmi-derived scripts may have descended from earlier forms.)	Tocharian (Note: Tocharian is probably derived from the middle period "Kushana" form of Brahmi, although artifacts from that time are not plentiful enough to establish a definite succession.) /
Gupta Brahmi	Pallava
Kadamba -
Bhaiksuki	Siddhaṃ	Grantha 𑌕	Cham ꨆ
Sinhala ක	Pyu / Old Mon (Note: Pyu and Old Mon are probably the precursors of the Burmese script, and may be derived from either the Pallava or Kadamba script) -
Tibetan	Newa 𑐎	Ahom 𑜀	Malayalam ക
Telugu క	Burmese က
Lepcha ᰀ	Ranjana	Saurashtra ꢒ	Dives Akuru 𑤌
Kannada ಕ	Kayah Li ꤊ
Limbu	Soyombo (Note: May also be derived from Devangari (see bottom left of table)) 𑩜	Khmer ក	Tamil
Chakma 𑄇	Tai Tham ᨠ
Meitei Mayek ꯀ	Gaudi -	Thai ก	Lao ກ / ໞ
Tai Le ᥐ
Marchen 𑱲	Tirhuta 𑒏	New Tai Lue ᦂ	Tai Viet ꪀ / ꪁ	Aksara Kawi
'Phags-pa ꡀ	Odia କ	Sharada 𑆑	Rejang ꤰ	Batak -	Buginese ᨀ
Zanabazar Square 𑨋	Bengali–Assamese	Takri 𑚊	Javanese ꦏ	Balinese ᬓ	Makasar 𑻠
Hangul (Note: The Origin of Hangul from 'Phags-pa is one of limited influence, inspiring at most a few basic letter shapes. Hangul does not function as an Indic abugida.) -	Northern Nagari -	Dogri 𑠊	Laṇḍā -	Sundanese ᮊ	Baybayin ᜃ
Modi 𑘎	Gujarati ક	Khojki 𑈈	Khudabadi 𑊺	Mahajani 𑅕	Tagbanwa ᝣ
Devanagari	Nandinagari 𑦮	Kaithi	Gurmukhi ਕ	Multani 𑊄	Buhid ᝃ
Canadian Syllabics (Note: Although the basic letter forms of the Canadian Aboriginal Syllabics were derived from handwritten Devanagari letters, this abugida indicates vowel sounds by rotations of the letter form, rather than the use of vowel diacritics as is standard in Indic abugidas.) -	Soyombo (Note: May also be derived from Ranjana (see above)) 𑩜	Sylheti Nagari ꠇ	Gunjala Gondi 𑵱	Masaram Gondi (Note: Masaram Gondi acts as an Indic abugida, but its letterforms were not derived from any single precursor script.) 𑴌	Hanuno'o ᜣ

== Character encodings of Ka ==
Most Indic scripts are encoded in the Unicode Standard, and as such the letter Ka in those scripts can be represented in plain text with unique codepoint. Ka from several modern-use scripts can also be found in legacy encodings, such as ISCII.

Character information
Preview							క		କ		ಕ		ക		ક		ਕ	
Unicode name	DEVANAGARI LETTER KA		BENGALI LETTER KA		TAMIL LETTER KA		TELUGU LETTER KA		ORIYA LETTER KA		KANNADA LETTER KA		MALAYALAM LETTER KA		GUJARATI LETTER KA		GURMUKHI LETTER KA	
Encodings	decimal	hex	dec	hex	dec	hex	dec	hex	dec	hex	dec	hex	dec	hex	dec	hex	dec	hex
Unicode	2325	U+0915	2453	U+0995	2965	U+0B95	3093	U+0C15	2837	U+0B15	3221	U+0C95	3349	U+0D15	2709	U+0A95	2581	U+0A15
UTF-8	224 164 149	E0 A4 95	224 166 149	E0 A6 95	224 174 149	E0 AE 95	224 176 149	E0 B0 95	224 172 149	E0 AC 95	224 178 149	E0 B2 95	224 180 149	E0 B4 95	224 170 149	E0 AA 95	224 168 149	E0 A8 95
Numeric character reference	&#2325;	&#x915;	&#2453;	&#x995;	&#2965;	&#xB95;	&#3093;	&#xC15;	&#2837;	&#xB15;	&#3221;	&#xC95;	&#3349;	&#xD15;	&#2709;	&#xA95;	&#2581;	&#xA15;
ISCII	179	B3	179	B3	179	B3	179	B3	179	B3	179	B3	179	B3	179	B3	179	B3

Character information
Preview	Ashoka Kushana Gupta		𐨐		𑖎		𑌕	
Unicode name	BRAHMI LETTER KA		KHAROSHTHI LETTER KA		SIDDHAM LETTER KA		GRANTHA LETTER KA	
Encodings	decimal	hex	dec	hex	dec	hex	dec	hex
Unicode	69651	U+11013	68112	U+10A10	71054	U+1158E	70421	U+11315
UTF-8	240 145 128 147	F0 91 80 93	240 144 168 144	F0 90 A8 90	240 145 150 142	F0 91 96 8E	240 145 140 149	F0 91 8C 95
UTF-16	55300 56339	D804 DC13	55298 56848	D802 DE10	55301 56718	D805 DD8E	55300 57109	D804 DF15
Numeric character reference	&#69651;	&#x11013;	&#68112;	&#x10A10;	&#71054;	&#x1158E;	&#70421;	&#x11315;

Character information
Preview			ྐ		ꡀ		𑨋		𑐎		𑰎		𑆑	
Unicode name	TIBETAN LETTER KA		TIBETAN SUBJOINED LETTER KA		PHAGS-PA LETTER KA		ZANABAZAR SQUARE LETTER KA		NEWA LETTER KA		BHAIKSUKI LETTER KA		SHARADA LETTER KA	
Encodings	decimal	hex	dec	hex	dec	hex	dec	hex	dec	hex	dec	hex	dec	hex
Unicode	3904	U+0F40	3984	U+0F90	43072	U+A840	72203	U+11A0B	70670	U+1140E	72718	U+11C0E	70033	U+11191
UTF-8	224 189 128	E0 BD 80	224 190 144	E0 BE 90	234 161 128	EA A1 80	240 145 168 139	F0 91 A8 8B	240 145 144 142	F0 91 90 8E	240 145 176 142	F0 91 B0 8E	240 145 134 145	F0 91 86 91
UTF-16	3904	0F40	3984	0F90	43072	A840	55302 56843	D806 DE0B	55301 56334	D805 DC0E	55303 56334	D807 DC0E	55300 56721	D804 DD91
Numeric character reference	&#3904;	&#xF40;	&#3984;	&#xF90;	&#43072;	&#xA840;	&#72203;	&#x11A0B;	&#70670;	&#x1140E;	&#72718;	&#x11C0E;	&#70033;	&#x11191;

Character information
Preview	က		ᨠ		ᦂ		ᧅ	
Unicode name	MYANMAR LETTER KA		TAI THAM LETTER HIGH KA		NEW TAI LUE LETTER HIGH KA		NEW TAI LUE LETTER FINAL K	
Encodings	decimal	hex	dec	hex	dec	hex	dec	hex
Unicode	4096	U+1000	6688	U+1A20	6530	U+1982	6597	U+19C5
UTF-8	225 128 128	E1 80 80	225 168 160	E1 A8 A0	225 166 130	E1 A6 82	225 167 133	E1 A7 85
Numeric character reference	&#4096;	&#x1000;	&#6688;	&#x1A20;	&#6530;	&#x1982;	&#6597;	&#x19C5;

Character information
Preview	ក		ກ		ໞ		ก		ꪀ		ꪁ	
Unicode name	KHMER LETTER KA		LAO LETTER KO		LAO LETTER KHMU GO		THAI CHARACTER KO KAI		TAI VIET LETTER LOW KO		TAI VIET LETTER HIGH KO	
Encodings	decimal	hex	dec	hex	dec	hex	dec	hex	dec	hex	dec	hex
Unicode	6016	U+1780	3713	U+0E81	3806	U+0EDE	3585	U+0E01	43648	U+AA80	43649	U+AA81
UTF-8	225 158 128	E1 9E 80	224 186 129	E0 BA 81	224 187 158	E0 BB 9E	224 184 129	E0 B8 81	234 170 128	EA AA 80	234 170 129	EA AA 81
Numeric character reference	&#6016;	&#x1780;	&#3713;	&#xE81;	&#3806;	&#xEDE;	&#3585;	&#xE01;	&#43648;	&#xAA80;	&#43649;	&#xAA81;

Character information
Preview	ක		ꤊ		𑄇		ᥐ		𑜀		𑤌		ꢒ		ꨆ	
Unicode name	SINHALA LETTER ALPAPRAANA KAYANNA		KAYAH LI LETTER KA		CHAKMA LETTER KAA		TAI LE LETTER KA		AHOM LETTER KA		DIVES AKURU LETTER KA		SAURASHTRA LETTER KA		CHAM LETTER KA	
Encodings	decimal	hex	dec	hex	dec	hex	dec	hex	dec	hex	dec	hex	dec	hex	dec	hex
Unicode	3482	U+0D9A	43274	U+A90A	69895	U+11107	6480	U+1950	71424	U+11700	71948	U+1190C	43154	U+A892	43526	U+AA06
UTF-8	224 182 154	E0 B6 9A	234 164 138	EA A4 8A	240 145 132 135	F0 91 84 87	225 165 144	E1 A5 90	240 145 156 128	F0 91 9C 80	240 145 164 140	F0 91 A4 8C	234 162 146	EA A2 92	234 168 134	EA A8 86
UTF-16	3482	0D9A	43274	A90A	55300 56583	D804 DD07	6480	1950	55301 57088	D805 DF00	55302 56588	D806 DD0C	43154	A892	43526	AA06
Numeric character reference	&#3482;	&#xD9A;	&#43274;	&#xA90A;	&#69895;	&#x11107;	&#6480;	&#x1950;	&#71424;	&#x11700;	&#71948;	&#x1190C;	&#43154;	&#xA892;	&#43526;	&#xAA06;

Character information
Preview	𑘎		𑦮		𑩜		ꠇ		𑵱			
Unicode name	MODI LETTER KA		NANDINAGARI LETTER KA		SOYOMBO LETTER KA		SYLOTI NAGRI LETTER KO		GUNJALA GONDI LETTER KA		KAITHI LETTER KA	
Encodings	decimal	hex	dec	hex	dec	hex	dec	hex	dec	hex	dec	hex
Unicode	71182	U+1160E	72110	U+119AE	72284	U+11A5C	43015	U+A807	73073	U+11D71	69773	U+1108D
UTF-8	240 145 152 142	F0 91 98 8E	240 145 166 174	F0 91 A6 AE	240 145 169 156	F0 91 A9 9C	234 160 135	EA A0 87	240 145 181 177	F0 91 B5 B1	240 145 130 141	F0 91 82 8D
UTF-16	55301 56846	D805 DE0E	55302 56750	D806 DDAE	55302 56924	D806 DE5C	43015	A807	55303 56689	D807 DD71	55300 56461	D804 DC8D
Numeric character reference	&#71182;	&#x1160E;	&#72110;	&#x119AE;	&#72284;	&#x11A5C;	&#43015;	&#xA807;	&#73073;	&#x11D71;	&#69773;	&#x1108D;

Character information
Preview	𑒏		ᰀ				ꯀ		𑱲	
Unicode name	TIRHUTA LETTER KA		LEPCHA LETTER KA		LIMBU LETTER KA		MEETEI MAYEK LETTER KOK		MARCHEN LETTER KA	
Encodings	decimal	hex	dec	hex	dec	hex	dec	hex	dec	hex
Unicode	70799	U+1148F	7168	U+1C00	6401	U+1901	43968	U+ABC0	72818	U+11C72
UTF-8	240 145 146 143	F0 91 92 8F	225 176 128	E1 B0 80	225 164 129	E1 A4 81	234 175 128	EA AF 80	240 145 177 178	F0 91 B1 B2
UTF-16	55301 56463	D805 DC8F	7168	1C00	6401	1901	43968	ABC0	55303 56434	D807 DC72
Numeric character reference	&#70799;	&#x1148F;	&#7168;	&#x1C00;	&#6401;	&#x1901;	&#43968;	&#xABC0;	&#72818;	&#x11C72;

Character information
Preview	𑚊		𑠊		𑈈		𑊺		𑅕		𑊄	
Unicode name	TAKRI LETTER KA		DOGRA LETTER KA		KHOJKI LETTER KA		KHUDAWADI LETTER KA		MAHAJANI LETTER KA		MULTANI LETTER KA	
Encodings	decimal	hex	dec	hex	dec	hex	dec	hex	dec	hex	dec	hex
Unicode	71306	U+1168A	71690	U+1180A	70152	U+11208	70330	U+112BA	69973	U+11155	70276	U+11284
UTF-8	240 145 154 138	F0 91 9A 8A	240 145 160 138	F0 91 A0 8A	240 145 136 136	F0 91 88 88	240 145 138 186	F0 91 8A BA	240 145 133 149	F0 91 85 95	240 145 138 132	F0 91 8A 84
UTF-16	55301 56970	D805 DE8A	55302 56330	D806 DC0A	55300 56840	D804 DE08	55300 57018	D804 DEBA	55300 56661	D804 DD55	55300 56964	D804 DE84
Numeric character reference	&#71306;	&#x1168A;	&#71690;	&#x1180A;	&#70152;	&#x11208;	&#70330;	&#x112BA;	&#69973;	&#x11155;	&#70276;	&#x11284;

Character information
Preview	ᬓ		ᨀ		ꦏ		𑻠		ꤰ		ᮊ	
Unicode name	BALINESE LETTER KA		BUGINESE LETTER KA		JAVANESE LETTER KA		MAKASAR LETTER KA		REJANG LETTER KA		SUNDANESE LETTER KA	
Encodings	decimal	hex	dec	hex	dec	hex	dec	hex	dec	hex	dec	hex
Unicode	6931	U+1B13	6656	U+1A00	43407	U+A98F	73440	U+11EE0	43312	U+A930	7050	U+1B8A
UTF-8	225 172 147	E1 AC 93	225 168 128	E1 A8 80	234 166 143	EA A6 8F	240 145 187 160	F0 91 BB A0	234 164 176	EA A4 B0	225 174 138	E1 AE 8A
UTF-16	6931	1B13	6656	1A00	43407	A98F	55303 57056	D807 DEE0	43312	A930	7050	1B8A
Numeric character reference	&#6931;	&#x1B13;	&#6656;	&#x1A00;	&#43407;	&#xA98F;	&#73440;	&#x11EE0;	&#43312;	&#xA930;	&#7050;	&#x1B8A;

Character information
Preview	ᜃ		ᝣ		ᝃ		ᜣ		𑴌	
Unicode name	TAGALOG LETTER KA		TAGBANWA LETTER KA		BUHID LETTER KA		HANUNOO LETTER KA		MASARAM GONDI LETTER KA	
Encodings	decimal	hex	dec	hex	dec	hex	dec	hex	dec	hex
Unicode	5891	U+1703	5987	U+1763	5955	U+1743	5923	U+1723	72972	U+11D0C
UTF-8	225 156 131	E1 9C 83	225 157 163	E1 9D A3	225 157 131	E1 9D 83	225 156 163	E1 9C A3	240 145 180 140	F0 91 B4 8C
UTF-16	5891	1703	5987	1763	5955	1743	5923	1723	55303 56588	D807 DD0C
Numeric character reference	&#5891;	&#x1703;	&#5987;	&#x1763;	&#5955;	&#x1743;	&#5923;	&#x1723;	&#72972;	&#x11D0C;
