= Plaintiff =

Party which initiates a court case

A plaintiff (Π in legal shorthand) is the party who initiates a lawsuit (also known as an action) before a court. By doing so, the plaintiff seeks a legal remedy. If this search is successful, the court will issue judgment in favor of the plaintiff and make the appropriate court order (e.g., an order for damages). Plaintiff is the term used in civil cases in most English-speaking jurisdictions, the notable exceptions being England and Wales, where a plaintiff has, since the introduction of the Civil Procedure Rules in 1999, been known as a "claimant" and Scotland, where the party has always been known as the "pursuer". In criminal cases, the prosecutor brings the case against the defendant, but the key complaining party is often called the "complainant".

In some jurisdictions, a lawsuit is commenced by filing a summons, claim form or a complaint. These documents are known as pleadings, that set forth the alleged wrongs committed by the defendant or defendants with a demand for relief. In other jurisdictions, the action is commenced by service of legal process by delivery of these documents on the defendant by a process server; they are only filed with the court subsequently with an affidavit from the process server that they had been given to the defendant according to the rules of civil procedure.

== Terminology ==
In most English-speaking jurisdictions, including Hong Kong, Nigeria, Australia (except in federal jurisdiction), Canada, the United States, Northern Ireland and the Republic of Ireland, the legal term "plaintiff" is used as a general term for the party taking action in a civil case.

The word plaintiff can be traced to the year 1278, and stems from the Anglo-French word pleintif meaning "complaining". It was identical to "plaintive" at first and receded into legal usage with the -iff spelling in the 15th century.

A plaintiff identified by name in a class action is called a named plaintiff.

In most common-law jurisdictions, the term "claimant" used in England and Wales since 1999 (see below) is used only in specific, often non-judicial contexts. In particular, in American usage, terms such as "claimant" and "claim form" are limited to extrajudicial process in insurance and administrative law. After exhausting remedies available through an insurer or government agency, an American claimant in need of further relief would turn to the courts, file a complaint (thus establishing a real court case under judicial supervision) and become a plaintiff.

In England and Wales, the term "claimant" replaced "plaintiff" after the Civil Procedure Rules came into force on 26 April 1999. The move, which brings England and Wales out of line with general usage in English-speaking jurisdictions, was reportedly based on an assessment that the word "claimant" is more acceptable as "plain English" than the word "plaintiff". In Scottish law a plaintiff is referred to as a "pursuer" and a defendant as a "defender".

The similar term "complainant" denotes the complaining witness in a criminal proceeding.

In the Federal Court of Australia, most plaintiffs are called "applicants", but in admiralty and corporations law matters they are called "plaintiffs".

== In case names ==
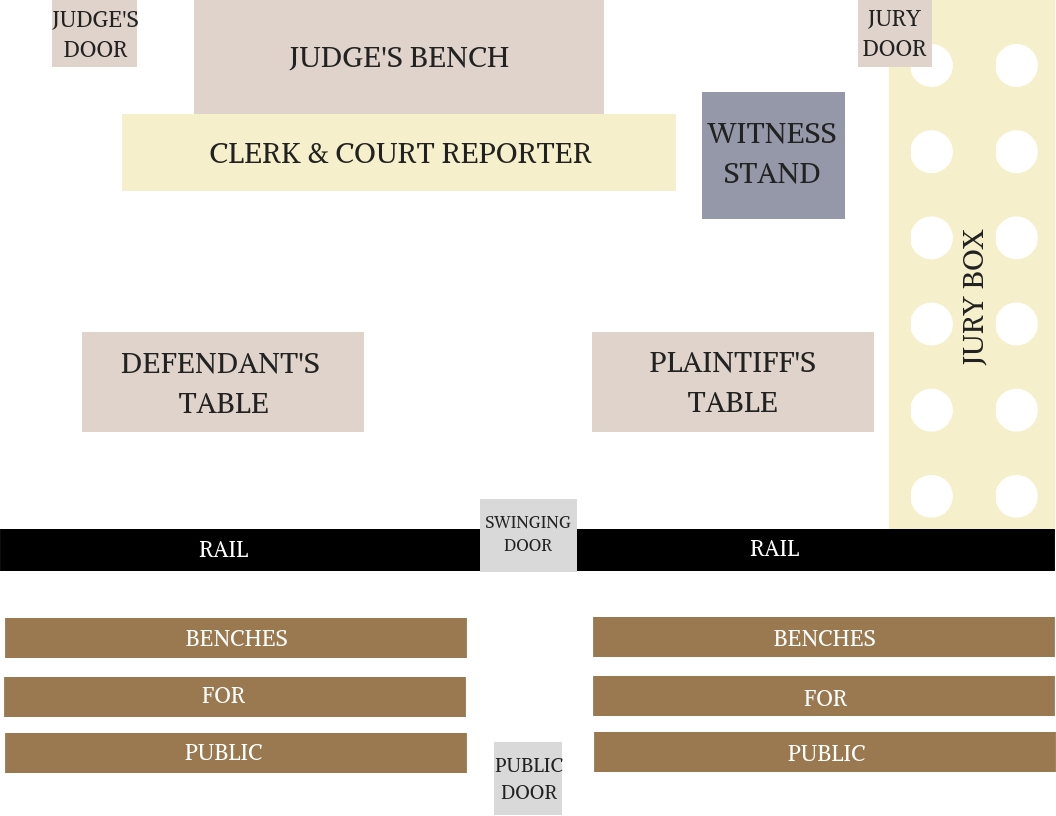
Courtroom with locations during Plaintiffs disputes in the United States

Case names are usually given with the plaintiff first, as in Plaintiff v. Defendant (orally, Plaintiff and Defendant). The party against whom the complaint is made is the defendant; or, in the case of a petition, a respondent. Subsequent references to a case may use only one of the names, typically that of the first nongovernmental party.

Criminal cases are usually brought by the prosecution, not a plaintiff. The prosecution may bring the case formally in the name of the monarch, state or government. In many Commonwealth realms, this is the king (or queen, when the monarch is female), named the Crown, abbreviated R, thus R v Defendant (orally, the Crown against (versus) Defendant). In several U.S. states, including California, Illinois, Michigan, and New York, the prosecution of a criminal case is captioned as The People of the State of, followed by the name of the state, or People for short.

== See also ==
- Brief (law)
- Conclusion of law
- Legal financing
- Defendant
- Lawsuit
- Findings of facts
