= Court of Exchequer =

Court of Exchequer may refer to:

- The English (later British) Exchequer and its constituent parts including
  - the Exchequer of Pleas, an ancient English court that ceased to exist independently in the late nineteenth century
  - the Court of Exchequer Chamber, an ancient English appellate court that ceased to exist independently in the late nineteenth century
- Court of Exchequer (Ireland)
- Court of Exchequer (Scotland), an ancient Scottish Court
