= Pi (letter) =

Greek letter

Pi (/ˈpaɪ/; /piː/ or /peî/, uppercase Π, lowercase π, cursive ϖ; Greek: πι) is the sixteenth letter of the Greek alphabet, representing the voiceless bilabial plosive IPA: [p]. In the system of Greek numerals it has a value of 80. It was derived from the Phoenician letter Pe (𐤐). Letters that arose from pi include Latin P, Cyrillic Pe (П, п), Coptic pi (Ⲡ, ⲡ), and Gothic pairthra (𐍀).

== Uppercase and lower case pi ==
- In mathematical finance both uppercase and lowercase are used in connection with portfolios. Lowercase is often used for a portfolio strategy. Uppercase is sometimes used for the monetary value of a portfolio.

== Uppercase pi ==
The uppercase letter Π is used as a symbol for:

- In textual criticism, Codex Petropolitanus, a 9th-century uncial codex of the Gospels, now located in St. Petersburg, Russia.
- In legal shorthand, it represents a plaintiff.

In science and engineering:

- The product operator in mathematics, indicated with capital pi notation Π (in analogy to the use of the capital Sigma Σ as summation symbol).
- The osmotic pressure in chemistry.
- The viscous stress tensor in continuum mechanics and fluid dynamics.
- The complete elliptic integral of the third kind, Π(n, k).

== Lowercase pi ==
The lowercase letter π is used as a symbol for:

- The mathematical real transcendental (and thus irrational) constant π ≈ 3.14159..., the ratio of a circle's circumference to its diameter in Euclidean geometry, exactly half of the circle constant. The letter "π" is the first letter of the Greek words περιφέρεια 'periphery' and περίμετρος 'perimeter', i.e. the circumference.
- The prime-counting function in mathematics.
- Homotopy groups in algebraic topology.
- Dimensionless parameters constructed using the Buckingham π theorem of dimensional analysis.
- The hadron called the pion (pi meson).
- Often inflation rate in macroeconomics.
- Sometimes profit in microeconomics.
- A type of chemical bond in which the p orbitals overlap, called a pi bond.
- The natural projection on the tangent bundle on a manifold.
- The unary operation of projection in relational algebra.
- Sometimes an element of a permutation group.
- Policy in reinforcement learning.

The earliest polyamory pride flag design, created by Jim Evans in 1995, in which the lowercase letter π stands for the first letter of polyamory.

- Polyamory (in the earliest polyamory pride flag design, created by Jim Evans in 1995, pi stands for the first letter of polyamory).

== History ==
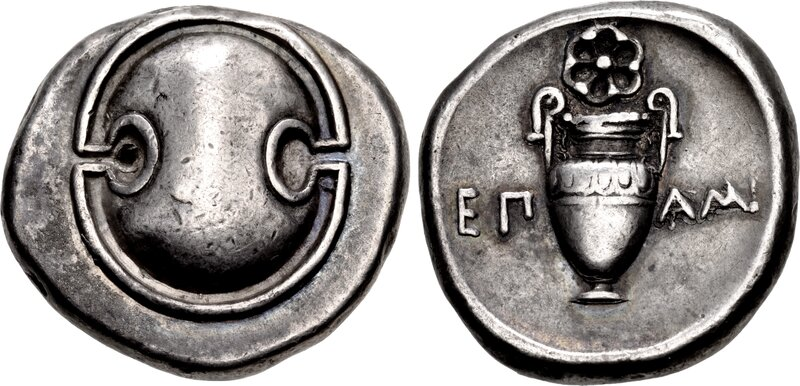
Coin of the Boeotian League minted c. 364–362 BC by Epaminondas (EΠ-AMI), with archaic form of pi.

An early form of pi was 𐅃, appearing almost like a gamma with a hook.

== Variant pi ==
Variant pi or "pomega" ($\varpi\,\!$ or ϖ) is a glyph variant of lowercase pi sometimes used in technical contexts. It resembles a lowercase omega with a macron, though historically it is simply a cursive form of pi, with its legs bent inward to meet. It was also used in the minuscule script. It is a symbol for:

- Angular frequency of a wave in fluid dynamics (angular frequency is usually represented by $\omega$ but this may be confused with vorticity in a fluid dynamics context).
- Longitude of pericenter in celestial mechanics.
- Comoving distance in cosmology.
- Single-scattering albedo in radiative transfer.
- Mean fitness of a population in biology.
- Fundamental weights of a representation (probably to better distinguish from elements $w$ of the Weyl group, than the usual notation $\omega$).
- The lemniscate constant.

== Unicode ==
Lower-case pi was fairly common in 8-bit character encodings, for instance it is at 0xE3 in CP437 and at 0xB9 on Mac OS Roman. The various forms of pi present in Unicode are:

- U+03A0 Π GREEK CAPITAL LETTER PI (&Pi;)
- U+03C0 π GREEK SMALL LETTER PI (&pi;)
- U+03D6 ϖ GREEK PI SYMBOL (&piv;, &varpi;)
- U+1D28 ᴨ GREEK LETTER SMALL CAPITAL PI
- U+213F ℿ DOUBLE-STRUCK CAPITAL PI
- U+213C ℼ DOUBLE-STRUCK SMALL PI
- U+220F ∏ N-ARY PRODUCT (&prod;, &Product;)
- U+2CA0 Ⲡ COPTIC CAPITAL LETTER PI
- U+2CA1 ⲡ COPTIC SMALL LETTER PI

The glyphs below are intended for use as mathematical symbols. Text written in the Greek language (i.e. words, as opposed to mathematics) should not use the symbols in the following list, but instead should use the normal Greek letters listed above, which have different code numbers and often a different appearance. Using the mathematical symbols to display words (or vice versa) is likely to result in inconsistent spacing and a clumsy, mismatched appearance:

- U+1D6B7 𝚷 MATHEMATICAL BOLD CAPITAL PI
- U+1D6D1 𝛑 MATHEMATICAL BOLD SMALL PI
- U+1D6E1 𝛡 MATHEMATICAL BOLD PI SYMBOL
- U+1D6F1 𝛱 MATHEMATICAL ITALIC CAPITAL PI
- U+1D70B 𝜋 MATHEMATICAL ITALIC SMALL PI
- U+1D71B 𝜛 MATHEMATICAL ITALIC PI SYMBOL
- U+1D72B 𝜫 MATHEMATICAL BOLD ITALIC CAPITAL PI
- U+1D745 𝝅 MATHEMATICAL BOLD ITALIC SMALL PI
- U+1D755 𝝕 MATHEMATICAL BOLD ITALIC PI SYMBOL
- U+1D765 𝝥 MATHEMATICAL SANS-SERIF BOLD CAPITAL PI
- U+1D77F 𝝿 MATHEMATICAL SANS-SERIF BOLD SMALL PI
- U+1D78F 𝞏 MATHEMATICAL SANS-SERIF BOLD PI SYMBOL
- U+1D79F 𝞟 MATHEMATICAL SANS-SERIF BOLD ITALIC CAPITAL PI
- U+1D7B9 𝞹 MATHEMATICAL SANS-SERIF BOLD ITALIC SMALL PI
- U+1D7C9 𝟉 MATHEMATICAL SANS-SERIF BOLD ITALIC PI SYMBOL

== See also ==
- Greek letters used in mathematics, science, and engineering § Ππ (pi)
- П, п – Pe (Cyrillic)
- P, p – Pe (Latin)
- Tau
