= European Law Reporter =

- Discipline: European Union and European Economic Area law
- Language: English, German
- Edited by: Carl Baudenbacher

Publication details
- History: 1998-present
- Publisher: Verlag radical brain S.A. (Luxembourg)
- Frequency: Bimonthly

Standard abbreviations
- ISO 4: Eur. Law Report.

Indexing
- ISSN: 1028-9690
- OCLC no.: 174316027

Links
- Journal homepage

The European Law Reporter is a bimonthly peer-reviewed academic journal covering European Union and European Economic Area law. It was established in 1998 and published articles till 2016, case-notes, and book reviews in both English and German which typically focus on recent jurisprudence of the Court of Justice of the European Union, the EFTA Court, and the European Court of Human Rights. The journal also covers supreme court judgments with a European dimension.
