= List of Catholic canon law legal abbreviations =

There are many legal abbreviations commonly used by canonists in the canon law of the Catholic Church. However, there is no single system of uniform citation, and so individual publishers and even the standard authors sometimes diverge on usage. This page includes citations, even if duplicative, commonly used in canonical scholarship and doctrine. Latin incipits and document titles have been italicized, while Latin words, phrases, official titles, and dicasterial names have not been so italicized.

== Symbol ==
- §—paragraph
- §§—paragraphs
- °—number

== 0-9 ==
- 17/CIC—1917 Codex Iuris Canonici
- 1917 CIC—1917 Codex Iuris Canonici
- 1983 CIC—1983 Codex Iuris Canonici

== A ==
- AAS—Acta Apostolicae Sedis
- ADCOV—Acta et Documenta Concilio Oecumenico Vaticano II apparando
- AL—Amoris Laetitia
- Ap.—apostolic
- Ap. const—apostolic constitution
- Art.—article or articulus
- Arts.—articles or articuli
- Artt.—articles or articuli
- ASS—Acta Sanctae Sedis

== C ==
- c.—canon/canonum, or coram (see "cor." below)
- cc.—canons/canones
- CCEO—Codex Canonum Ecclesiarum Orientalium
- CDF—Congregation for the Doctrine of the Faith or Congregatio pro Doctrina Fidei
- CDWDS—Congregation for Divine Worship and the Discipline of the Sacraments
- ch.—chapter/caput
- chh.—chapters/capites
- CIC—Codex Iuris Canonici (may refer to 1917 code or 1983 code depending upon context)
- CIC/1917—Codex Iuris Canonici of 1917
- CIC/1983—Codex Iuris Canonici of 1983
- CICLSAL—Congregation for Institutes of Consecrated Life and Societies of Apostolic Life
- CLSA—Canon Law Society of America
- congr.—congregation (Roman Curia)
- cor.—coram, a (usually appellate) cause heard "in the presence of" an auditor of the Roman Rota

== D ==
- Decr.—decretum
- DPM—ap. const. Divinus perfectionis Magister on the causes of saints
- DV—Defensor Vinculi or Dei verbum

== E ==
- EP—Episcopal vicar

== G ==
- GS—Gaudium et spes

== I ==
- ICEL—International Commission on English in the Liturgy
- ID—Indulgentiarum doctrina
- IM—Inter mirifica

== J ==
- J—The Jurist, published by the CUA School of Canon Law, 1940-
- JCB— Juris Canonici Baccalaureus
- JCD—Juris Canonici Doctor
- JCL—Juris Canonici Licentiatus
- JPE—Jus Publicum Ecclesiasticum
- JV—Judicial vicar

== L ==
- LEF—Lex Ecclesiæ Fundamentalis
- LG—Lumen gentium

== M ==
- MP—motu proprio

== N ==
- NCCB—National Conference of Catholic Bishops (previous name of the United States Conference of Catholic Bishops)
- NEP—Nota explicativa praevia to ch. 3 of Lumen Gentium

== P ==
- PB—ap. const. Pastor Bonus
- PCLT—Pontifical Council for Legislative Texts
- PCILT—Pontifical Council for the Interpretation of Legislative Texts
- Pont. Max—Pontifex Maximus
- PP.—Papa, Latin for pope.

== R ==
- RI—Regulæ Iuris (cf. RJ)
- RJ—Regulæ Juris (cf. RI)
- RR—Roman Replies and CLSA Advisory Opinions, published by the Canon Law Society of America (1981-1983 Roman Replies alone, combined with CLSA Advisory Opinions 1984-)

== S ==
- S. Congr.—Sacred Congregation (the former name of Roman curial congregations before "sacred" was dropped in 1984 by the ap. const. Pastor Bonus)
- SCR—Sacred Congregation of Rites
- SRE—Sancta Romana Ecclesia
- SRR—Sacræ Rotæ Romanæ

== T ==
- TRR—Tribunal of the Roman Rota

== U ==
- UDG—Universi Dominici gregis
- USCCB—United States Conference of Catholic Bishops

== V ==
- VDQ—Vultum Dei quaerere
- VG—Vicar general
